

Deaths in April

 9 : Nick Adenhart
 13 : Mark Fidrych
 13 : Harry Kalas
 27 : Karl Mullen
 27 : Greg Page

Current sporting seasons

Australian rules football 2009

Australian Football League

Auto racing 2009

Formula One
Sprint Cup
IRL

Nationwide Series
Camping World Truck Series
A1 Grand Prix

WTTC
V8 Supercar
American Le Mans
Le Mans Series
Rolex Sports Car Series

World Series by Renault
Super GT

Baseball 2009

Major League Baseball
Nippon Professional Baseball

Basketball 2008–09

American competitions:
NBA Playoffs
Pan-European competitions:
Euroleague

Greece
Iran
Israel
Italy
Philippines
Fiesta Conference
Spain
Turkey

Cricket 2008–09

Football (soccer)

2008–09
2010 FIFA World Cup Qualifying
UEFA (Europe) Champions League
UEFA Cup
Copa Libertadores (South America)
CONCACAF (North & Central America) Champions League
OFC (Oceania) Champions League
AFC (Asia) Champions League
CAF (Africa) Champions League
England
Germany
Iran
Italy
Spain
France
Argentina
2009
Major League Soccer
Japan
Women's Professional Soccer

Golf 2009

European Tour
PGA Tour
LPGA Tour

Ice hockey 2008–09

Stanley Cup playoffs

Motorcycle racing 2009

Superbike World Championship
Supersport racing

Rugby league 2009

Super League
NRL

Rugby union 2008–09

Heineken Cup
English Premiership
Celtic League
Top 14
Super 14
Sevens World Series

Days of the month

April 30, 2009 (Thursday)

Basketball
NBA Playoffs First Round: (seeding in parentheses)
Game 6: (7) Chicago Bulls 128, (2) Boston Celtics 127 (3 OT). Series tied 3–3.
Derrick Rose's block of Rajon Rondo's fadeaway jumper with 7 seconds left in the third overtime gives the Bulls their third overtime win of the series to force a 7th game in Boston on May 2. Ray Allen scores a playoff career-high 51 points for the Celtics, who blow an 8-points lead with 3 minutes remaining in regulation time. John Salmons leads the Bulls with 35 points.
Game 6: (3) Orlando Magic 114, (6) Philadelphia 76ers 89. Magic win series 4–2.
The Magic, playing without the suspended Dwight Howard, hand the Sixers their worst playoff home defeat since 1970.
Game 6: (5) Houston Rockets 92, (4) Portland Trail Blazers 76. Rockets win series 4–2.
The Rockets win their first playoff series in 12 years, ending a streak of 7 series losses, while the Blazers lose their fifth straight playoff series. The Rockets will play against the Los Angeles Lakers in the Conference Semifinal.

Cycling
UCI ProTour:
Tour de Romandie:
Stage 2: (1) Óscar Freire  4h 6' 56" (2) František Raboň  (Team Columbia–High Road) s.t. (3) Assan Bazayev  s.t.
General Classification: (1) Grégory Rast  (Astana) 6h 19' 13" (2) Ricardo Serrano  (Fuji–Servetto) + 5" (3) Lars Bak  (Team Saxo Bank) + 12"

Football (soccer)
UEFA Cup Semifinals, first leg:
Dynamo Kyiv  1–1  Shakhtar Donetsk
Werder Bremen  0–1  Hamburg
Copa Libertadores group stage: (Teams in bold advance to the last 16 stage; teams in strike are eliminated.)
Group 2:
Guaraní  1–1  Deportivo Cuenca
Thanks to Boca's win, Cuenca's draw is sufficient to send them through.
Boca Juniors  3–0  Deportivo Táchira
Group 3:
Nacional  3–1  Nacional
River Plate  3–0  U. San Martín

Ice hockey
Stanley Cup playoffs: (seeding in parentheses)
Western Conference Semifinals:
Game 1: (3) Vancouver Canucks 5, (4) Chicago Blackhawks 3. Canucks lead series 1–0.
Sami Salo scores the game-winning goal for the Canucks with 1:13 left after the Blackhawks rally from 3 goals down to tie the score.
World Championship in Berne and Kloten, Switzerland: (Teams in bold advance to the quarterfinals)
Group E:
 6–5 (OT) 
 1–2 (SO) 
Group F:
 3–2 (OT) 
 5–1

April 29, 2009 (Wednesday)

Basketball
NBA Playoffs First Round: (seeding in parentheses)
Game 5: (4) Atlanta Hawks 106, (5) Miami Heat 91. Hawks lead series 3–2.
The Hawks make 12 consecutive field goal attempts in the second quarter to build a 23-point halftime lead, and cruise from there.
Game 5: (2) Denver Nuggets 107, (7) New Orleans Hornets 86. Nuggets win series 4–1.
Carmelo Anthony scores 34 points and leads the Nuggets to their first playoff series win in 15 years, and a matchup with the Dallas Mavericks in the second round.

Cycling
UCI ProTour:
Tour de Romandie:
Stage 1: (1) Ricardo Serrano  2h 8' 35" (2) Lars Bak  s.t. (3) Grégory Rast  s.t.
General classification: (1) Rast 2hr 12' 17" (2) Serrano + 5" (3) Bak + 12"

Football (soccer)
UEFA Champions League Semifinals, first leg:
Manchester United  1–0  Arsenal
John O'Shea scores the winning goal in the 17th minute.
Copa Libertadores group stage: (Teams in bold advance to the last 16 stage, teams in strike are eliminated)
Group 1:
LDU Quito  2–3  Sport Recife
Colo-Colo  0–1  Palmeiras
Group 6:
Lanús  1–1  Caracas
Everton  1–1  Guadalajara

Ice hockey
World Championship in Berne and Kloten, Switzerland: (Teams in bold advance to the Qualifying Round)
Group C:
 0–2 
 6–5 (OT) 
Sweden rallies from 3 goals down with 10 minutes remaining in the 3rd period. USA still remain in first place with 7 points, followed by Sweden 6, Latvia 5, Austria 0.
Group D:
 4–5 (OT) 
 4–3 
Standings: Finland 9 points, Czech Republic 6, Norway 2, Denmark 1.

Water polo
World League:
Preliminary round, Europe group A, matchday 4 of 6:
 –

April 28, 2009 (Tuesday)

Basketball
NBA Playoffs First Round: (seeding in parentheses)
Game 5: (2) Boston Celtics 106, (7) Chicago Bulls 104 (OT). Celtics lead series 3–2.
Paul Pierce scores with 10.5 seconds remaining in regulation to send the game to overtime, making it the first playoff series in history with three games going to overtime. Then he scores the game-winning basket with 3.4 seconds remaining in overtime. The Bulls' Brad Miller could have extended the game into a second overtime but miss from the free throw line.
Game 5: (3) Orlando Magic 91, (6) Philadelphia 76ers 78. Magic lead series 3–2.
Dwight Howard leads the Magic with 24 points and 24 rebounds, but he is later suspended from game 6 for hitting Samuel Dalembert with his elbow.
Game 5: (6) Dallas Mavericks 106, (3) San Antonio Spurs 93. Mavericks win series 4–1.
Dirk Nowitzki scores 31 points for his 30th 30-points playoff game and leads the Mavericks to the second round for the first time in 3 years, while the Spurs are eliminated in the first round for the first time since 2000.
Game 5: (4) Portland Trail Blazers 88, (5) Houston Rockets 77. Rockets lead series 3–2.
LaMarcus Aldridge and Brandon Roy score 25 points each and the Blazers make a 15–0 run in the fourth quarter to stay alive in the series.
NBA awards:
NBA Sportsmanship Award: Chauncey Billups, Denver Nuggets

Cycling
UCI ProTour:
Tour de Romandie:
Prologue (3.1 km): (1) František Raboň  (Team Columbia–High Road) 3min 44.56sec, (2) Sandy Casar  at 2sec, (3) Alejandro Valverde  3sec

Football (soccer)
UEFA Champions League Semifinals, first leg:
Barcelona  0–0  Chelsea
Copa Libertadores group stage: (Teams in bold advance to the last 16 stage, teams in strike are eliminated)
Group 7:
Aurora  1–2  Universidad de Chile
Grêmio  3–0  Boyacá Chicó
Group 8:
San Lorenzo  2–0  Universitario
Libertad  0–2  San Luis

Ice hockey
Stanley Cup playoffs: (Seeding in parentheses)
Eastern Conference Quarterfinals:
Game 7, (2) Washington Capitals 2, (7) New York Rangers 1. Capitals win series 4–3.
Sergei Fedorov scores the game-winning goal with 4:39 left, making him the oldest player in history to score a game-winning goal in game 7. The Capitals will next play against the Pittsburgh Penguins.
Game 7, (6) Carolina Hurricanes 4, (3) New Jersey Devils 3. Hurricanes win series 4–3.
Jussi Jokinen and Eric Staal score for the Hurricanes in the last 1:20 to win the series and set up a second round series against the Boston Bruins.
World Championship in Berne and Kloten, Switzerland: (Teams in bold advance to the Qualifying Round)
Group A:
 1–3 
 7–3 
Final standings: Canada 9 points, Belarus 5, Slovakia 4, Hungary 0.
Group B:
 4–2 
 2–1 
Final standings: Russia 9 points, Switzerland 5, France 3, Germany 1.

April 27, 2009 (Monday)

Basketball
NBA Playoffs First Round: (seeding in parentheses)
Game 4: (4) Atlanta Hawks 81, (5) Miami Heat 71. Series tied 2–2.
The Hawks win their first playoff road game in 12 years.
Game 4: (2) Denver Nuggets 121, (7) New Orleans Hornets 63. Nuggets lead series 3–1.
The Nuggets tie the most lopsided win in playoff history, and are within one game of their first series win in 15 years.
Game 5: (1) Los Angeles Lakers 107, (8) Utah Jazz 96. Lakers win series 4–1.
Kobe Bryant gets another 30-point game, and Lamar Odom scores 26 points and grabs 15 rebounds as the Lakers close the series with their fourth double-digit win.

Cricket
Australia vs Pakistan in UAE:
3rd ODI in Abu Dhabi
 198/7 (50 ov);  171 (47.1 ov). Australia win by 27 runs and lead 5-match series 2–1.

Ice hockey
Stanley Cup playoffs: (Seeding in parentheses)
Western Conference Quarterfinals:
Game 6, (4) Chicago Blackhawks 4, (5) Calgary Flames 1. Blackhawks win series 4–2.
The 'Hawks win their first playoff series in 13 years, and will next play the Vancouver Canucks.
Game 6, (8) Anaheim Ducks 4, (1) San Jose Sharks 1. Ducks win series 4–2.
The Sharks become the fourth Presidents' Trophy winner to be eliminated in the first round. The Ducks will next play against the defending champion Detroit Red Wings.
World Championship in Berne and Kloten, Switzerland: (Teams in bold advance to the Qualifying Round)
Group C:
 6–1 
 3–2 (SO) 
Group D:
 5–2 
 5–1

April 26, 2009 (Sunday)

Athletics
London Marathon:
Men: (1) Sammy Wanjiru  2hrs 05 mins 10 sec (course record) (2) Tsegaye Kebede  2:05:20 (3) Jaouad Gharib  2:05:27
Women: (1) Irina Mikitenko  2hrs 22mins 11sec (2) Mara Yamauchi  2:23:12 (3) Liliya Shobukhova  2:24:24
Hamburg Marathon:
Men: (1) Solomon Tside  2hrs 11mins 47 secs (2) Charles Ngolepus  2:13:25 (3) Jose Telles des Souza  2:14:46
Women: (1) Alessandra Aguilar  2hrs 29mins 01 secs (2) Tigist Abdi Sheni  2:34:01 secs (3) Ulrike Maisch  2:34:28

Auto racing
Formula One:
Bahrain Grand Prix in Sakhir, Bahrain:
(1) Jenson Button  (Brawn–Mercedes) (2) Sebastian Vettel  (Red Bull–Renault) (3) Jarno Trulli  (Toyota)
Drivers standings (after 4 of 17 races): (1) Button 31 points (2) Rubens Barrichello  (Brawn-Mercedes) 19 (3) Vettel 18
Sprint Cup Series:
Aaron's 499 in Talladega, Alabama:
(1) Brad Keselowski  (Phoenix Racing) (2) Dale Earnhardt Jr.  (Hendrick Motorsports) (3) Ryan Newman  (Stewart Haas Racing)
Keselowski collects his first career Cup win.
Drivers' standings after 9 races: (1) Kurt Busch  1299 points (2) Jeff Gordon  −5 (3) Jimmie Johnson  −64
IndyCar Series:
RoadRunner Turbo Indy 300 in Kansas City, Kansas:
(1) Scott Dixon  (2) Hélio Castroneves  (3) Tony Kanaan 
Drivers standings (after 3 races): (1) Kanaan 100 points (2) Ryan Briscoe  99 (3) Dario Franchitti  96
World Rally Championship:
Rally Argentina:
(1) Sébastien Loeb  (2) Dani Sordo  (3) Henning Solberg 
Drivers standings (after 5 of 12 rallies): (1) Loeb 50 points (2) Sordo 31 (3) Mikko Hirvonen  30

Basketball
NBA Playoffs First Round (seeding in parentheses)
Game 4: (7) Chicago Bulls 121, (2) Boston Celtics 118 (2OT). Series tied 2–2.
The Bulls get their second win in overtime to tie the series.
Game 4: (1) Cleveland Cavaliers 99, (8) Detroit Pistons 78. Cavaliers win series 4–0.
The Cavaliers, led by 36 points by LeBron James, become the third team in history to sweep a 4-game series with double-digit wins in all games.
Game 4: (3) Orlando Magic 84, (6) Philadelphia 76ers 81. Series tied 2–2.
Hedo Türkoğlu scores a three-pointer with one second left to win the game for the Magic, who were led by Dwight Howard's 18 points and 18 rebounds.
Game 4: (5) Houston Rockets 89, (4) Portland Trail Blazers 88. Rockets lead series 3–1.
The Rockets, led by Yao Ming with 21 points and 12 rebounds, are within one game of their first series win in 11 years.
EuroChallenge Final Four in Bologna, Italy:
Final: Cholet Basket  75–77  Virtus Bologna
3rd place playoff: BC Triumph  94–82  Proteas EKA AEL

Cycling
Monument Classics:
Liège–Bastogne–Liège:
(1) Andy Schleck  (Team Saxo Bank) 6h 34' 32" (2) Joaquim Rodríguez  +1' 17" (3) Davide Rebellin  (Diquigiovanni–Androni) +1' 24"

Football (soccer)
Rio de Janeiro Championship, first leg:
Botafogo 2–2 Flamengo
São Paulo Championship, first leg:
Santos 1–3 Corinthians

Golf
PGA Tour:
Zurich Classic of New Orleans in New Orleans, Louisiana
Winner: Jerry Kelly  274 (−14)
 Kelly wins on tour for the first time since 2002, with Rory Sabbatini , Charlie Wi , and Charles Howell III  one shot back.
European Tour:
Ballantine's Championship in Jeju Island, South Korea
Winner: Thongchai Jaidee  284 (−4)
Thongchai wins in a three-way playoff over Gonzalo Fernández-Castaño  and Kang Sung-hoon .
LPGA Tour:
Corona Championship in Morelia, Mexico
Winner: Lorena Ochoa  267 (−25)
 The world's #1 player holds off Suzann Pettersen  for a one-shot win; no other golfer comes within seven shots.

Ice hockey
Stanley Cup playoffs: (Seeding in parentheses)
Eastern Conference Quarterfinals:
Game 6, (2) Washington Capitals 5, (7) New York Rangers 3. Series tied 3–3.
Game 6, (6) Carolina Hurricanes 4, (3) New Jersey Devils 0. Series tied 3–3.
World Championship in Berne and Kloten, Switzerland: (Teams in bold advance to the Qualifying Round)
Group A:
 1–2 (SO) 
 9–0 
Group B:
 3–2 (OT) 
 7–2

Motorcycle racing
Moto GP:
Japanese motorcycle Grand Prix in Motegi, Japan:
MotoGP: (1) Jorge Lorenzo  (Yamaha) 43:47.238 (2) Valentino Rossi  (Yamaha) +1.304 (3) Dani Pedrosa  (Honda) +3.763
Riders' standings after 2 of 17 races: (1) Lorenzo 41 points (2) Rossi 40 (3) Casey Stoner  (Ducati) 38
250cc: (1) Álvaro Bautista  (Aprilia) 44:06.488 (2)  Hiroshi Aoyama  (Honda) +5.889 (3) Mattia Pasini  (Aprilia) +21.832
Riders' standings: (1) Bautista 34 points (2) H. Aoyama 33 (3) Héctor Barberá  (Aprilia) 30
125cc: (1) Andrea Iannone  (Aprilia) 42:23.716 (2) Julián Simón  (Aprilia) +1.346 (3) Pol Espargaró  (Derbi) +5.039
Riders' standings: (1) Iannone 37.5 points (2) Simón 30 (3) Espargaró 22.5
Superbike World Championship:
Assen Superbike World Championship round in Assen, Netherlands:
Race 1: (1) Ben Spies  (Yamaha YZF-R1) 36:31.338 (2) Noriyuki Haga  (Ducati 1098R) +0.154 (3) Leon Haslam  (Honda CBR1000RR) +0.779
Race 2: (1) Haga 36:31.712 (2) Haslam +2.678 (3) Jakub Smrž  (Ducati 1098R) +4.603
Riders' standings after 4 of 14 rounds: (1) Haga 180 points (2) Spies 120 (3) Haslam 94
Supersport: (1) Eugene Laverty  (Honda CBR600RR) 35:45.160 (2) Cal Crutchlow  (Yamaha YZF-R6) +0.107 (3) Joan Lascorz  (Kawasaki ZX-6R) +0.178
Riders standings: (1) Crutchlow 74 points (2) Laverty 68 (3) Kenan Sofuoğlu  (Honda CBR600RR) 65

Tennis
ATP Tour:
Torneo Godó in Barcelona, Spain:
Final:  Rafael Nadal def.  David Ferrer, 6–2, 7–5
Nadal wins his 4th title this year and 5th consecutive win at the event.
Fed Cup:
World Group Semifinals, day 2:
 4–1  in Castellaneta, Italy
 2–3  in Brno, Czech Republic
Italy will host USA in the final on November 7–8.
World Group Play-offs: (Winners advance to World Group in 2010, losers will play in World Group II)
 0–4  in Lerida, Spain
 3–2  in Limoges, France
 3–2  in Frankfurt, Germany
 0–5  in Mar del Plata, Argentina
Serbia and Ukraine both advance to the World Group for the first time, while Spain is relegated to World Group II for the first time.
World Group II Play-offs: (Winners advance to World Group II in 2010, losers will play in zonal group I)
 3–2  in Hasselt, Belgium
 3–2  in Tallinn, Estonia
 3–2  in Gdynia, Poland
 3–1  in Mildura, Australia
Estonia and Poland both advance to World Group II for the first time.

April 25, 2009 (Saturday)

American football
NFL Draft in New York City
(1) Detroit Lions select Georgia quarterback Matthew Stafford
(2) St. Louis Rams select Baylor offensive tackle Jason Smith
(3) Kansas City Chiefs select LSU defensive end Tyson Jackson

Auto racing
Nationwide Series:
Aaron's 312 in Talladega, Alabama
(1) David Ragan  (Roush Fenway Racing) (2) Ryan Newman  (Kevin Harvick Incorporated) (3) Joey Logano  (Joe Gibbs Racing)

Basketball
NBA Playoffs First Round (seeding in parentheses)
Game 3: (7) New Orleans Hornets 95, (2) Denver Nuggets 93. Nuggets lead series 2–1.
Chris Paul leads the Hornets with 32 points and 12 assists.
Game 4: (6) Dallas Mavericks 99, (3) San Antonio Spurs 90. Mavericks lead series 3–1.
The Mavericks, led by Josh Howard with 28 points, take a 3–1 lead in the series despite 43 points by Tony Parker for the Spurs.
Game 3: (5) Miami Heat 107, (4) Atlanta Hawks 78. Heat lead series 2–1.
Dwyane Wade leads the Heat to a blowout win with 29 points.
Game 4: (1) Los Angeles Lakers 108, (8) Utah Jazz 94. Lakers lead series 3–1.
Kobe Bryant scores 38 points for his 50th playoff 30-points game, and moves to 7th place in the all-time playoff scoring list. The series goes back to Los Angeles with the Lakers one win away from the second round.

Football (soccer)
OFC Champions League Final, first leg:
Koloale  2–7  Auckland City
French League Cup Final in Saint-Denis:
Bordeaux 4–0 Vannes

Ice hockey
Stanley Cup playoffs (seeding in parentheses)
Eastern Conference Quarterfinals:
Game 6: (4) Pittsburgh Penguins 5, (5) Philadelphia Flyers 3. Penguins win series 4–2.
The Penguins rally from 3 goals down to clinch the series.
Western Conference Quarterfinals:
Game 5: (1) San Jose Sharks 3, (8) Anaheim Ducks 2 (OT). Ducks lead series 3–2.
Patrick Marleau scores 6:02 into overtime to keep the Sharks alive in the series.
Game 5: (4) Chicago Blackhawks 5, (5) Calgary Flames 1. Blackhawks lead series 3–2.
The 'Hawks are one win away from their first series win in 13 years.
World Championship in Berne and Kloten, Switzerland:
Group C:
 4–2 
 7–1 
Group D:
 0–5 
 5–0

Tennis
Fed Cup:
World Group Semifinals, day 1:
 2–0  in Castellaneta, Italy
 1–1  in Brno, Czech Republic
World Group Play-offs:
 0–2  in Lerida, Spain
 1–1  in Limoges, France
 2–0  in Frankfurt, Germany
 0–2  in Mar del Plata, Argentina
World Group II Play-offs:
 1–1  in Hasselt, Belgium
 1–1  in Tallinn, Estonia
 1–1  in Gdynia, Poland
 2–0  in Mildura, Australia

April 24, 2009 (Friday)

American football
 NFL Draft news:
 ESPN reports that the Detroit Lions will make Georgia quarterback Matthew Stafford the first overall pick after both agree on a six-year, US$72 million deal. (ESPN)

Basketball
NBA Playoffs First Round (seeding in parentheses)
Game 3: (1) Cleveland Cavaliers 79, (8) Detroit Pistons 68. Cavaliers lead series 3–0.
The Cavs make an 18–2 run in the fourth quarter to get within one game of a series victory.
Game 3: (6) Philadelphia 76ers 96, (3) Orlando Magic 94. 76ers lead series 2–1.
The Magic rally from 17 points deficit to level the score, but Thaddeus Young scores with 2 seconds remaining to give the win to the Sixers.
Game 3: (5) Houston Rockets 86, (4) Portland Trail Blazers 83. Rockets lead series 2–1.
NBA awards:
J. Walter Kennedy Citizenship Award: Dikembe Mutombo, Houston Rockets
 Mutombo, who announced his retirement following a knee injury suffered in Game 2 of the Blazers-Rockets series, becomes the first player ever to win the award twice.
EuroChallenge Final Four in Bologna, Italy:
Semifinals:
Cholet Basket  81–78  BC Triumph
Virtus Bologna  83–69  Proteas EKA AEL

Cricket
Australia vs Pakistan in UAE:
2nd ODI in Dubai
 207 (46.2 ov);  208/4 (45.1 ov). Australia win by 6 wickets and levels 5-match series 1–1.

Ice hockey
Stanley Cup playoffs: (Seeding in parentheses)
Eastern Conference Quarterfinals:
Game 5, (2) Washington Capitals 4, (7) New York Rangers 0. Rangers lead series 3–2.
The Caps get their second 4–0 shutout of the series.
World Championship in Berne and Kloten, Switzerland:
Group A:
 1–6 
 4–3 
Group B:
 0–5 
 1–0

April 23, 2009 (Thursday)

Basketball
NBA Playoffs First Round (seeding in parentheses)
Game 3: (2) Boston Celtics 107, (7) Chicago Bulls 86. Celtics lead series 2–1.
Paul Pierce scores 24 points to lead the Celtics to an easy win in Chicago.
Game 3: (6) Dallas Mavericks 88, (3) San Antonio Spurs 67. Mavericks lead series 2–1.
The Spurs' 67 points are their lowest score in franchise playoff history.
Game 3: (8) Utah Jazz 88, (1) Los Angeles Lakers 86. Lakers lead series 2–1.
Deron Williams scores the winning basket for the Jazz with 2.2 seconds left.

Football (soccer)
Copa Libertadores group stage: (Teams in bold advance to the last 16 stage, teams in strike are eliminated)
Group 2:
Deportivo Cuenca  1–0  Boca Juniors
Boca Juniors miss a chance to secure their place in the last 16, but remain in pole position in the group with 12 points from 5 games, ahead of Deportivo Cuenca and Deportivo Táchira with 9.
Group 3:
Nacional  4–2  River Plate
River Plate's loss secures Universidad San Martín a berth in the last 16.

Ice hockey
Stanley Cup playoffs (seeding in parentheses)
Eastern Conference Quarterfinals:
Game 5: (3) New Jersey Devils 1, (6) Carolina Hurricanes 0. Devils lead series 3–2.
 Goaltender Martin Brodeur shakes off a first-period skate cut on his ankle and collects his 23rd playoff shutout, tying Patrick Roy's record.
Game 5: (5) Philadelphia Flyers 3, (4) Pittsburgh Penguins 0. Penguins lead series 3–2.
Western Conference Quarterfinals:
Game 4: (8) Anaheim Ducks 4, (1) San Jose Sharks 0. Ducks lead series 3–1.
Jonas Hiller makes his second shutout of the series.
Game 4: (2) Detroit Red Wings 6, (7) Columbus Blue Jackets 5. Red Wings win series 4–0.
Johan Franzen scores the game-winning goal with 47 seconds left to play to wrap up the series for the Red Wings, who become the first defending champion in seven years that advances to the second round.

Shooting
ISSF World Cup in Beijing, China: (qualification scores in parentheses)
Men's 50 metre rifle three positions:  Ole Magnus Bakken  1276.7 (1179)  Rajmond Debevec  1275.9 (1180)  Stevan Pletikosić  1271.4 (1173)

April 22, 2009 (Wednesday)

Basketball
NBA Playoffs First Round: (Seeding in parentheses)
Game 2, (3) Orlando Magic 96, (6) Philadelphia 76ers 87. Series tied 1–1.
Game 2, (5) Miami Heat 108, (4) Atlanta Hawks 93. Series tied 1–1.
Dwyane Wade's 33 points lead the Heat to their first playoff win since the 2006 NBA Finals.
Game 2, (2) Denver Nuggets 108, (7) New Orleans Hornets 93. Nuggets lead series 2–0.
Chauncey Billups scores 31 points to add to 36 he scored in game 1, and the Nuggets win two games in a playoff series for the first time in 15 years.
NBA awards:
Rookie of the Year: Derrick Rose, Chicago Bulls
Sixth Man of the Year: Jason Terry, Dallas Mavericks

Cricket
Australia vs Pakistan in UAE:
1st ODI in Dubai:
 168 (38.5 ov);  171/6 (44.1 ov). Pakistan win by 4 wickets, lead 5-match series 1–0.

Cycling
La Flèche Wallonne:
(1) Davide Rebellin  (Diquigiovanni–Androni) 4hr 42min 15sec (2) Andy Schleck  (Team Saxo Bank) at 0:02 (3) Damiano Cunego  0:02

Football (soccer)
Copa Libertadores group stage: (Teams in bold advance to the last 16 stage, teams in strike are eliminated)
Group 1:
Sport Recife  2–1  Colo-Colo
Sport Recife's win secures them a berth in the last 16 and eliminates defending champion LDU Quito.
Group 4:
São Paulo  2–1  América de Cali
Defensor Sporting  4–3  Independiente Medellín
Álvaro Navarro's goal in the 4th minute of injury time gives Defensor the win they need to advance to the last 16.
Group 5:
Universitario de Sucre  0–0  Estudiantes
Cruzeiro  2–0  Deportivo Quito
CONCACAF Champions League Final, first leg:
Cruz Azul  0–2  Atlante
AFC Champions League group stage, matchday 4: (Teams in bold advance to the last 16 stage, teams in strike are eliminated)
Group A:
Pakhtakor Tashkent  2–1  Saba Battery
Al-Ahli  1–3  Al-Hilal
Pakhtakor lead the group with 10 points, ahead of Al-Hilal with 8.
Group C:
Esteghlal  1–1  Umm-Salal
Al-Ittihad  1–1  Al-Jazira
Al-Ittihad lead the group with 8 points, followed by Umm-Salal with 7.
Group E:
Newcastle United Jets  0–1  Nagoya Grampus
Beijing Guoan  0–1  Ulsan Hyundai Horang-i
Nagoya lead the group with 8 points, followed by Ulsan with 6.
Group G:
Kashima Antlers  5–0  Singapore Armed Forces
Suwon Bluewings  2–1  Shanghai Shenhua
Kashima and Suwon lead the group with 9 points.

Ice hockey
Stanley Cup playoffs: (Seeding in parentheses)
Eastern Conference Quarterfinals:
Game 4, (1) Boston Bruins 4, (8) Montreal Canadiens 1. Bruins win series 4–0.
The Bruins win their first playoff series in 10 years.
Game 4, (7) New York Rangers 2, (2) Washington Capitals 1. Rangers lead series 3–1.
Western Conference Quarterfinals:
Game 4, (5) Calgary Flames 6, (4) Chicago Blackhawks 4. Series tied 2–2.

Shooting
ISSF World Cup in Beijing, China: (qualification scores in parentheses)
Men's 25 metre rapid fire pistol:  Keith Sanderson  780.5 (584)  Vijay Kumar  780.4 (581)  Teruyoshi Akiyama  777.5 (579)

April 21, 2009 (Tuesday)

Basketball
NBA Playoffs First Round: (Seeding in parentheses)
Game 2, (1) Cleveland Cavaliers 94, (8) Detroit Pistons 82. Cavaliers lead series 2–0.
The Cavs survive a late scare from the Pistons, who cut their deficit to 7 points near the end after trailing by 29.
Game 2, (4) Portland Trail Blazers 107, (5) Houston Rockets 103. Series tied 1–1.
Brandon Roy scores 42 to give the Blazers their first playoff win since 2003.
Game 2, (1) Los Angeles Lakers 119, (8) Utah Jazz 109. Lakers lead series 2–0.
Lakers' coach Phil Jackson set an NBA record with his 195th playoff win.
NBA awards:
Defensive Player of the Year: Dwight Howard, Orlando Magic.
Twenty-three-year-old Howard is the youngest ever player to win the award.

Football (soccer)
Copa Libertadores group stage: (Teams in bold advance to the last 16 stage, teams in strike are eliminated)
Group 1:
Palmeiras  2–0  LDU Quito
Defending champion LDU Quito will be eliminated if Sport Recife win or draw against Colo-Colo on Wednesday.
Group 3:
U. San Martín  1–1  Nacional
The draw secures Nacional a berth in the last 16 and eliminates Nacional of Paraguay.
AFC Champions League group stage, matchday 4: (Teams in bold advance to the last 16 stage, teams in strike are eliminated)
Group B:
Al-Shabab  5–0  Sharjah
Al-Gharafa  5–1  Persepolis
Al-Shabab lead the group with 10 points, ahead of Persepolis with 7 and Al-Gharafa with 6.
Group D:
Sepahan  0–1  Bunyodkor
Al-Shabab Al-Arabi  1–4  Al-Ettifaq
Al-Ettifaq lead the group with 9 points, followed by Bunyodkur with 7.
Group F:
Sriwijaya  0–3  Gamba Osaka
Osaka win its fourth straight match and advance to the last 16.
Seoul  1–1  Shandong Luneng
Shandong is in second place with 7 points, ahead of Seoul with 4.
Group H:
Kawasaki Frontale  2–1  Central Coast Mariners
Tianjin Teda  0–0  Pohang Steelers
Kawasaki lead the group with 10 points, ahead of Pohang with 6.

Ice hockey
Stanley Cup playoffs: (Seeding in parentheses)
Eastern Conference Quarterfinals:
Game 4, (6) Carolina Hurricanes 4, (3) New Jersey Devils 3. Series tied 2–2.
Jussi Jokinen scores the winning goal for the Hurricanes with 0.2 second left  – the latest goal in playoff history – after the Devils rally from 3 goals down to level the score.
Game 4, (4) Pittsburgh Penguins 3, (5) Philadelphia Flyers 1. Penguins lead series 3–1.
Western Conference Quarterfinals:
Game 3, (1) San Jose Sharks 4, (8) Anaheim Ducks 3. Ducks lead series 2–1.
Game 3, (2) Detroit Red Wings 4, (7) Columbus Blue Jackets 1. Red Wings lead series 3–0.
Game 4, (3) Vancouver Canucks 3, (6) St. Louis Blues 2 (OT). Canucks win series 4–0.
Alex Burrows's goal with 19 seconds left in the first overtime period gives the Canucks their first four-game sweep in franchise history.

Shooting
ISSF World Cup in Beijing, China: (qualification scores in parentheses)
Women's 50 metre rifle three positions:  Lioubov Galkina  679.9 (578)  Xiong Meili  675.8 (577)  Wan Xianggyan  670.7 (568)
Women's 10 metre air pistol:  Hu Jun  490.5 (390)  Heena Sidhu  486.8 (385)  Lenka Marušková  485.9 (385)

April 20, 2009 (Monday)

Athletics
113th Boston Marathon:
Men: (1) Deriba Merga  2:08:42 (2) Daniel Rono  2:09:32 (3) Ryan Hall  2:09:40
Women: (1) Salina Kosgei  2:32:16 (2) Dire Tune  2:32:17 (3) Kara Goucher  2:32:25

Basketball
NBA Playoffs First Round (seeding in parentheses):
Game 2, (2) Boston Celtics 118, (7) Chicago Bulls 115. Series tied 1–1.
Ray Allen scores 30 points, including the winning three-pointer with 2 seconds left, to send the series to Chicago level at 1 game apiece. Ben Gordon scores 42 in a losing effort.
Game 2, (3) San Antonio Spurs 105, (6) Dallas Mavericks 84. Series tied 1–1.
38 points from Tony Parker help the Spurs level the series.
NBA awards:
Coach of the Year: Mike Brown, Cleveland Cavaliers

Ice hockey
Stanley Cup playoffs: (Seeding in parentheses)
Eastern Conference Quarterfinals:
Game 3, (1) Boston Bruins 4, (8) Montreal Canadiens 2. Bruins lead series 3–0.
Game 3, (2) Washington Capitals 4, (7) New York Rangers 0. Rangers lead series 2–1.
Rookie goalie Semyon Varlamov made his first career shutout and the Caps' first playoff shutout in six years.
Western Conference Quarterfinals:
Game 3, (5) Calgary Flames 4, (4) Chicago Blackhawks 2. Blackhawks lead series 2–1.

Shooting
ISSF World Cup in Beijing, China: (qualification scores in parentheses)
Men's 50 metre rifle prone:  Warren Potent  701.5 (597)  Josselin Henry  698.8 (595)  Michael McPhail  698.7 (594)
Men's 10 metre air pistol:  Shi Xinglong  683.0 (582)  Mai Jiajie  682.8 (582)  Yury Dauhapolau  682.5 (583)

April 19, 2009 (Sunday)

Auto racing
Formula One:
Chinese Grand Prix in Shanghai, China:
(1) Sebastian Vettel  (Red Bull–Renault) 1:57:43.485 (2) Mark Webber  (Red Bull-Renault) +10.970 (3) Jenson Button  (Brawn–Mercedes) +44.975
Drivers standings (after 3 of 17 races): (1) Button 21 points (2) Rubens Barrichello  (Brawn-Mercedes) 15 (3) Vettel & Timo Glock  (Toyota) 10
Constructors standings: (1) Brawn-Mercedes 36 points (2) Red Bull-Renault 19.5 (3) Toyota 18.5
IndyCar Series:
Long Beach Grand Prix in Long Beach, California
(1) Dario Franchitti  (2) Will Power  (3) Tony Kanaan 
Standings: (1) Franchitti 84 (2) Power 69 (3) Ryan Briscoe  67
V8 Supercars:
Hamilton 400 in Hamilton, New Zealand
Round 4: (1) Jamie Whincup  (2) James Courtney  (3) Steven Johnson 
Standings (after 4 of 26 races): (1) Jamie Whincup  600 (2) Lee Holdsworth  498 (3) Will Davison  483

Basketball
NBA Playoffs First Round: (Seeding in parentheses, All times ET)
Game 1, (1) Los Angeles Lakers 113, (8) Utah Jazz 110. Lakers lead series 1–0.
Kobe Bryant leads the Lakers with 24 points as coach Phil Jackson improves his record in series opening games to 42–0.
Game 1, (6) Philadelphia 76ers 100, (3) Orlando Magic 98. 76ers lead series 1–0.
The Sixers rally from 18-points down to win the game with Andre Iguodala's field goal 2 seconds from the end.
Game 1, (4) Atlanta Hawks 90, (5) Miami Heat 64. Hawks lead series 1–0.
Game 1, (2) Denver Nuggets 113, (7) New Orleans Hornets 84. Nuggets lead series 1–0.
Israel women league:
Game 4 of best-of-5 final series:
Elitzur Ramla 53–61 Electra Ramat HaSharon. Ramat HaSharon win the series 3–1 and its first championship in 6 years.

Cricket
ICC World Cup Qualifier in South Africa:
Final:
In Centurion:  185 (48 ov);  188/1 (42.3 ov). Ireland win by 9 wickets.
3rd Place Playoff:
In Potchefstroom:  179 (43.1 ov);  183/4 (32.1 ov). Netherlands win by 6 wickets.
5th Place Playoff:
In Benoni:  295/8 (50 ov);  206 (40 ov). Afghanistan win by 89 runs.
7th Place Playoff:
In Krugersdorp:  267/9 (50 ov);  269/6 (41.3 ov). United Arab Emirates win by 4 wickets.

Cycling
UCI ProTour:
Amstel Gold Race:
(1) Serguei Ivanov  (Katusha) (2) Karsten Kroon  (Saxo Bank) (3) Robert Gesink 

Football (soccer)
CAF Champions League Second Round, first leg:
ASEC Mimosas  1–0  Monomotapa United
Heartland  2–1  Cotonsport
FA Cup Semi-finals at Wembley Stadium:
Manchester United 0–0 (AET) Everton. Everton wins 4–2 on penalties.
Everton spoils Manchester United's quest for a quintuple of titles, and will meet Chelsea in the final on May 30.
Rio de Janeiro Championships:
Taça Rio Final at Maracanã Stadium:
Botafogo 0–1 Flamengo
Netherlands League:
AZ secure the league title for the second time in its history, with 3 matches remaining, and become the first champion outside the "big three" (Ajax, Feyenoord and PSV) in 28 years.

Golf
PGA Tour:
Verizon Heritage in Hilton Head Island, South Carolina
Winner: Brian Gay  264 (−20)
Gay breaks the tournament record by one stroke and wins by a margin of 10 strokes, also a record.
European Tour:
Volvo China Open in Beijing, China:
Winner: Scott Strange  280 (−8)
Strange wins by one stroke over Gonzalo Fernández-Castaño.

Ice hockey
Stanley Cup playoffs: (Seeding in parentheses, All times ET)
Eastern Conference Quarterfinals:
Game 3, (3) New Jersey Devils 3, (6) Carolina Hurricanes 2 (OT). Devils lead series 2–1.
Game 3, (5) Philadelphia Flyers 6, (4) Pittsburgh Penguins 3. Penguins lead series 2–1.
Western Conference Quarterfinals:
Game 2, (8) Anaheim Ducks 3, (1) San Jose Sharks 2. Ducks lead series 2–0.
Game 3, (3) Vancouver Canucks 3, (6) St. Louis Blues 2. Canucks lead series 3–0.
World U18 Championships in Fargo, North Dakota & Moorhead, Minnesota, United States:
Final:
  5–0  
3rd place playoff:
 4–5 (SO)

Shooting
ISSF World Cup in Beijing, China: (qualification scores in parentheses)
Men's 50 metre pistol:  Rashid Yunusmetov  660.5 (568)  Pavol Kopp  657.1 (561)  Vladimir Isakov  654.5 (557)
Women's 10 metre air rifle:  Yin Wen  503.4 (399)  Yi Siling  501.5 (399)  Snježana Pejčić  500.7 (399)
Women's 25 metre pistol:  Zhao Xu  787.6 (580)  Lalita Yauhleuskaya  786.1 (585)  Viktoria Chaika  785.7 (585)

Tennis
ATP Tour:
Monte Carlo Masters in Roquebrune-Cap-Martin, France:
Final:  Rafael Nadal def.  Novak Djokovic, 6–3, 2–6, 6–1.
Nadal wins his fifth successive title at Monte Carlo.
WTA Tour:
Family Circle Cup in Charleston, South Carolina, United States:
Final:  Sabine Lisicki def.  Caroline Wozniacki, 6–2, 6–4
Lisicki wins her first WTA Tour title.
Barcelona Ladies Open in Barcelona, Spain:
Final:  Roberta Vinci def.  Maria Kirilenko, 6–0, 6–4.

April 18, 2009 (Saturday)

Auto racing
Sprint Cup Series:
Subway Fresh Fit 500 in Avondale, Arizona
(1) Mark Martin  (Hendrick Motorsports) (2) Tony Stewart  (Stewart Haas Racing) (3) Kurt Busch  (Penske Championship Racing)
Martin wins a Cup race for the first time since 2005.
Drivers' standings after 8 races: (1) Jeff Gordon  1242 points (2) Jimmie Johnson  −85 (3) Kurt Busch −98
V8 Supercars:
Hamilton 400 in Hamilton, New Zealand
Round 3: (1) Jamie Whincup  (2) Mark Winterbottom  (3) Lee Holdsworth 
Standings (after 3 of 26 races): (1) Whincup 450 (2) Will Davison  387 (3) Holdsworth 378

Basketball
NBA Playoffs First Round: (Seedings in parentheses)
Eastern Conference:
Game 1, (7) Chicago Bulls 105, (2) Boston Celtics 103 (OT). Bulls lead series 1–0.
The Bulls win their first ever playoff game against the Celtics, and Derrick Rose scores 36 points to tie Kareem Abdul-Jabbar's record for a rookie in his playoff debut.
Game 1, (1) Cleveland Cavaliers 102, (8) Detroit Pistons 84. Cavaliers lead series 1–0.
LeBron James scores 38 points for the Cavaliers, including a 41-foot basket at the halftime buzzer.
Western Conference:
Game 1, (6) Dallas Mavericks 105, (3) San Antonio Spurs 97. Mavericks lead series 1–0.
The Mavericks get their first road win in the playoffs after nine consecutive losses.
Game 1, (5) Houston Rockets 108, (4) Portland Trail Blazers 81. Rockets lead series 1–0.
Yao Ming scores 9-from-9 field goals, the first player since 1986 and the sixth in playoff history to get a perfect record from at least 9 FG attempts.
Adriatic League Final:
Cibona Zagreb 49–63 Partizan Belgrade
Partizan win the trophy for the third straight season.

Football (soccer)
CAF Champions League Second Round, first leg:
Al Ahly Tripoli  0–0  Étoile Sportive du Sahel
Kano Pillars  1–1  Al Ahly
Primeiro de Agosto  3–1  Al-Hilal
Djoliba  0–0  ZESCO United
TP Mazembe  1–0  Ittihad Khemisset

Ice hockey
Stanley Cup playoffs: (Seeding in parentheses)
Eastern Conference Quarterfinals:
Game 2, (1) Boston Bruins 5, (8) Montreal Canadiens 1. Bruins lead series 2–0.
Game 2, (7) New York Rangers 1, (2) Washington Capitals 0. Rangers lead series 2–0.
Western Conference Quarterfinals:
Game 2, (2) Detroit Red Wings 4, (7) Columbus Blue Jackets 0. Red Wings lead series 2–0.
Chris Osgood makes his 14th career playoff shutout for the Red Wings, who attempt to be the first defending champion to reach the second round in seven years.
Game 2, (4) Chicago Blackhawks 3, (5) Calgary Flames 2. Blackhawks lead series 2–0.
The 'Hawks rally from 2 goals down to win two playoff games for the first time in 11 years.
World U18 Championships in Fargo, North Dakota & Moorhead, Minnesota, United States:
5th place playoff:
 4–2 
Relegation Round: (Teams in bold stay in top division, teams in strike are relegated to Division I)
 2–4 
 2–5

Rugby union
EDF Energy Cup Final in London:
Gloucester  12–50  Cardiff Blues

Shooting
ISSF World Cup in Beijing, China: (qualification scores in parentheses)
Men's 10 metre air rifle:  Péter Sidi  699.5 (598)  Zhu Qinan  699.3+10.7 (597)  Václav Haman  699.3+10.4 (595)

Winter sports

Figure skating
ISU World Team Trophy in Tokyo, Japan:
Pairs standings after Free Skating:  Zhang Dan/Zhang Hao  193.82  Yuko Kavaguti/Alexander Smirnov  185.15  Jessica Dubé/Bryce Davison  164.12
Ladies standings after Free Skating:  Mao Asada  201.87  Joannie Rochette  182.16  Caroline Zhang  175.68
Final team standings: (1)  60 points, (2)  54, (3)  50, 4.  37, 5.  35, 6.  34

April 17, 2009 (Friday)

Auto racing
Nationwide Series:
Bashas' Supermarkets 200 in Avondale, Arizona
(1) Greg Biffle  (Roush Fenway Racing) (2) Jason Leffler  (Braun Racing) (3) Brad Keselowski  (JR Motorsports)
IndyCar Series news:
 Two-time Indianapolis 500 champion Hélio Castroneves is acquitted in federal court in Miami on six counts of tax evasion. (AP/ESPN)

Baseball
 Major League Baseball news:
 Gary Sheffield of the New York Mets becomes the 25th player in MLB history to hit his 500th home run, hitting a solo shot off the Milwaukee Brewers' Mitch Stetter in the seventh inning of the Mets' 5–4 home win.

Cricket
Australia in South Africa:
5th ODI in Johannesburg:
 303/7 (50 ov);  256 (45.5 ov). Australia win by 47 runs. South Africa win the 5-match series 3–2.
ICC World Cup Qualifier in South Africa:
Super Eights: (Teams in bold qualify for the 2011 World Cup, teams in italics gain ODI status, teams in strike are eliminated from ODI status)
In Benoni:  299/7 (50 ov);  177 (39.4 ov). Scotland win by 122 runs.
Scotland's win gives them ODI status, while UAE finish 7th and fails to gain ODI status by inferior NRR.
In Pretoria:  208/9 (50 ov);  209/4 (48 ov). Kenya win by 6 wickets.
Both teams qualify for the World Cup and retain their ODI status. Ireland finish in first place despite their loss, Kenya in third.
In Krugersdorp:  243/7 (50 ov);  222 (48.3 ov). Afghanistan win by 21 runs.
Afghanistan, who played in World Cricket League Division Five a year ago, gets ODI status with their win over Namibia, that finish bottom of the group.
In Johannesburg:  205/8 (50 ov);  206/4 (47.1 ov). Netherlands win by 6 wickets.
Both teams qualify for the World Cup and retain ODI status. Canada finish second by better NRR and will meet Ireland in the final, Netherlands will play against Kenya in 3rd place playoff.
Final standings: Ireland 10 points, Canada, Kenya, Netherlands 8, Scotland, Afghanistan, UAE 6, Namibia 4.
The ICC announces that Pakistan will not host the 2011 World Cup, citing an "uncertain security situation". The tournament will still be held in India, Sri Lanka, and Bangladesh.

Football (soccer)
CAF Champions League Second Round, first leg:
Kampala City Council  0–1  Al-Merreikh

Ice hockey
Stanley Cup playoffs: (Seeding in parentheses)
Eastern Conference Quarterfinals:
Game 2, (6) Carolina Hurricanes 2, (3) New Jersey Devils 1 (OT). Series tied 1–1.
Game 2, (4) Pittsburgh Penguins 3, (5) Philadelphia Flyers 2 (OT). Penguins lead series 2–0.
Western Conference Quarterfinals:
Game 2, (3) Vancouver Canucks 3, (6) St. Louis Blues 0. Canucks lead series 2–0.
World U18 Championships in Fargo, North Dakota & Moorhead, Minnesota, United States:
Semifinals:
 1–2 
 0–4 
Relegation Round:
 4–5 (SO) 
Germany's win in shootout means Switzerland stay in the top division and Norway is relegated.
World Championship Division I:
Group A in Vilnius, Lithuania:
 5–1 
Australia is relegated to Division II.
 1–2 
Kazakhstan advance to the top division.
Group B in Toruń, Poland:
 5–1 
Romania is relegated to Division II.
 2–0 
Italy advance to the top division.

Winter sports

Figure skating
ISU World Team Trophy in Tokyo, Japan:
Pairs Short Program: (1) Zhang Dan/Zhang Hao  70.42 (2) Yuko Kavaguti/Alexander Smirnov  65.08 (3) Caydee Denney/Jeremy Barrett  56.58
Ice dance standings after Free Dance:  Tanith Belbin/Benjamin Agosto  162.98  Tessa Virtue/Scott Moir  156.71  Nathalie Péchalat/Fabian Bourzat  150.63
Men's standings after Free Skating:  Evan Lysacek  238.56  Brian Joubert  237.09  Nobunari Oda  229.25
Team standings after day 2: (1)  59 points, (2)  53, (3)  52, 4.  37, 5.  36, 6.  33

April 16, 2009 (Thursday)

Baseball
Major League Baseball season home opener:
Cleveland Indians 10, New York Yankees 2
The Yankees open the new Yankee Stadium with a blowout loss to the Indians, who score 9 runs in the 7th inning including a grand slam by Grady Sizemore. Earlier, the Yankees' Jorge Posada hit the first home run in the ballpark's history.

Basketball
Israel women league:
Game 3 of best-of-5 final series:
Electra Ramat HaSharon 96–66 Elitzur Ramla. Ramat HaSharon lead the series 2–1.

Football (soccer)
UEFA Cup Quarterfinals, second leg: (First leg results in parentheses)
Dynamo Kyiv  3–0 (0–0)  Paris Saint-Germain
Dynamo Kyiv win 3–0 on aggregate.
Marseille  1–2 (0–2)  Shakhtar Donetsk
Shakhtar Donetsk win 4–1 on aggregate.
Donetsk and Kyiv will meet in an all-Ukrainian semifinal, which guarantees a Ukrainian team in a European final for the first time since the country split from USSR. Until this season, no Ukrainian team advanced beyond the last-16 stage.
Manchester City  2–1 (1–3)  Hamburg
Hamburg win 4–3 on aggregate.
Udinese  3–3 (1–3)  Werder Bremen
Werder Bremen come back from 2-goals down to level the score and win 6–4 on aggregate.
Hamburg will meet North Germany rival Bremen in the semifinals.
Copa Libertadores group stage: (Teams in bold advance to the last 16 stage, teams in strike are eliminated)
Group 2:
Deportivo Táchira  2–1  Guaraní
Boca Juniors lead the group with 12 points from 4 games, ahead of Deportivo Táchira with 9 from 5 and Deportivo Cuenca with 6 from 4. Boca Juniors will advance to the last 16 stage with a win or draw against Cuenca on April 23.
Group 4:
América de Cali  0–0  Defensor Sporting
São Paulo lead the group with 10 points from 5 games, followed by Independiente Medellín with 7 and Defensor Sporting with 5.
Group 7:
Boyacá Chicó  2–1  Aurora
Grêmio lead the group with 13 points from 5 games, ahead of Boyacá Chicó with 9 and Universidad de Chile with 7.

Ice hockey
Stanley Cup playoffs: (Seeding in parentheses)
Eastern Conference Quarterfinals:
Game 1, (1) Boston Bruins 4, (8) Montreal Canadiens 2. Bruins lead series 1–0.
Western Conference Quarterfinals:
Game 1, (8) Anaheim Ducks 2, (1) San Jose Sharks 0.  Ducks lead series  1–0.
Game 1, (2) Detroit Red Wings 4, (7) Columbus Blue Jackets 1. Red Wings lead series 1–0.
Red Wings' defenseman Chris Chelios set an NHL record with his 261st playoff game.
Game 1, (4) Chicago Blackhawks 3, (5) Calgary Flames 2 (OT). Blackhawks lead series 1–0.
Martin Havlát scores 12 seconds into overtime, the third fastest overtime goal in playoff history, to give the Blackhawks their first playoff win in seven years.
World U18 Championships in Fargo, North Dakota & Moorhead, Minnesota, United States:
Quarterfinals:
 1–4 
Russia will play against Finland in the semifinals.
 6–2 
USA will play against Canada in the semifinals.
Relegation Round:
 7–3

Winter sports

Figure skating
ISU World Team Trophy in Tokyo, Japan:
Original Dance: (1) Tanith Belbin/Benjamin Agosto  64.27 (2) Tessa Virtue/Scott Moir  60.98 (3) Jana Khokhlova/Sergei Novitski  58.58
Men's Short Program: (1) Brian Joubert  85.39 (2) Evan Lysacek  83.70 (3) Nobunari Oda  79.35
Ladies Short Program: (1) Mao Asada  75.84 (2) Joannie Rochette  62.08 (3) Miki Ando  62.08
Team standings after day 1: (1)  48 points, (2)  43, (3)  39, 4.  32, 5.  29, 6.  22

April 15, 2009 (Wednesday)

Basketball
NBA: End of the regular season:
Eastern Conference:
The Philadelphia 76ers clinch sixth place with a 111–110 overtime win over the Cleveland Cavaliers, combined with the Chicago Bulls' 109–98 loss to the Toronto Raptors. The Sixers will play in the first round of the playoffs against the #3 seed Orlando Magic. The Bulls end in seventh place and will meet the #2 Boston Celtics.
The Cavaliers' loss prevents them from equalling the NBA record of 40 home wins in a season set by the 1985–86 Celtics.
Western Conference:
The San Antonio Spurs clinch the Southwest Division title and third place in the Conference with a 105–98 overtime win over the New Orleans Hornets, coupled with the Houston Rockets' 95–84 loss to the Dallas Mavericks.
The Mavericks clinch sixth place with their win over Houston and the Hornets' loss to San Antonio, and will meet the Spurs in the playoffs. New Orleans end in seventh place, and will play against the Denver Nuggets, who secure second place as a result of the Rockets' loss.
The Portland Trail Blazers clinch fourth place and home advantage in a playoff series against the Rockets with a 104–76 win over the Nuggets.

Cricket
ICC World Cup Qualifier in South Africa:
Super Eights (teams in bold qualify for the 2011 World Cup; teams in italics gain/retain ODI status):
In Benoni:  279 (50 overs);  237/9 (47.1 overs). Afghanistan win by 42 runs.
In Pretoria:  222 (50 overs);  226/4 (44.3 overs). Ireland win by 6 wickets.
Ireland advance to the final, and secure a berth in the World Cup.
In Krugersdorp:  194 (49.5 overs);  200/5 (31.2 overs). United Arab Emirates win by 5 wickets.
In Johannesburg:  305 (49.5 overs);  104 (30 overs). Namibia win by 201 runs.
Standings after 6 of 7 rounds: Ireland 10 points; Canada 8; Kenya, Netherlands, UAE 6; Namibia, Afghanistan, Scotland 4.

Football (soccer)
UEFA Champions League Quarterfinals, second leg: (First leg result in parentheses)
Arsenal  3–0 (1–1)  Villarreal
Arsenal win 4–1 on aggregate, with goals by Theo Walcott, Emmanuel Adebayor and Robin van Persie.
Porto  0–1 (2–2)  Manchester United
Cristiano Ronaldo's goal from 35 metres in the 6th minute gives Manchester United 3–2 win on aggregate, and an all-England match with Arsenal in the semifinals.
Copa Libertadores group stage: (Teams in bold advance to the last 16 stage; teams in strike are eliminated)
Group 1:
Palmeiras  1–1  Sport Recife
Sport Recife and Colo-Colo lead the group with 7 points from 4 games.
Group 4:
Independiente Medellín  2–1  São Paulo
Group 7:
Universidad de Chile  0–2  Grêmio
Gremio clinch a berth in the last 16.
Finnish League Cup final in Vantaa:
Tampere United 2–0 HJK Helsinki

Ice hockey
Stanley Cup playoffs: (Seeding in parentheses)
Eastern Conference Quarterfinals:
Game 1, (7) New York Rangers 4, (2) Washington Capitals 3. Rangers lead series 1–0.
Game 1, (3) New Jersey Devils 4, (6) Carolina Hurricanes 1. Devils lead series 1–0.
Game 1, (4) Pittsburgh Penguins 4, (5) Philadelphia Flyers 1. Penguins lead series 1–0.
Western Conference Quarterfinals:
Game 1, (3) Vancouver Canucks 2, (6) St. Louis Blues 1. Canucks lead series 1–0.

Shooting
ISSF World Cup in Changwon, South Korea: (qualification scores in parentheses)
Men's 50 metre rifle three positions:  Gagan Narang  1264.0 (1166)  Han Jin-seop  1261.9 (1165)  Aleksey Kamensky  1261.7 (1167)

Water polo
World League:
Preliminary round, Europe group B, matchday 4 of 6:
  12–10

April 14, 2009 (Tuesday)

Basketball
NBA:
The Philadelphia 76ers' 100–98 loss to the Boston Celtics puts them one game behind the Chicago Bulls in the race for sixth place in the Eastern Conference. Unless the Sixers beat the Cleveland Cavaliers on Wednesday and the Bulls lose to the Toronto Raptors, Philadelphia will meet the Celtics again in the playoffs this weekend, and Chicago will play against the Orlando Magic.
The Utah Jazz are confirmed in 8th place in the Western Conference after a 125–112 loss to the Los Angeles Lakers, and will meet the Lakers again in the first round.

Boxing
 Oscar De La Hoya, a 10-time world champion in six different weight classes, announces his retirement. (AP/ESPN)

Football (soccer)
UEFA Champions League Quarterfinals, second leg: (First leg result in parentheses)
Chelsea  4–4 (3–1)  Liverpool
Liverpool leads 2–0 and 4–3 and gets within one goal of advancing, but in the end Chelsea wins 7–5 on aggregate.
Bayern Munich  1–1 (0–4)  Barcelona
Barcelona wins 5–1 on aggregate and will play against Chelsea in the semifinals.
Copa Libertadores group stage: (Teams in bold advance to the last 16 stage, teams in strike are eliminated)
Group 5:
Deportivo Quito  3–1  Universitario de Sucre
Deportivo's win keeps them in contention for a last 16 berth with 8 points from 5 games, behind Cruzeiro with 10 pts and Estudiantes with 9.
Group 6:
Caracas  1–0  Everton
Guadalajara  0–0  Lanús
Caracas lead the group with 9 points from 5 games, followed by Guagalajara with 8 pts and Everton with 7.

Ice hockey
World U18 Championships in Fargo, North Dakota & Moorhead, Minnesota, United States: (Teams in bold clinch a semifinal berth, teams in italics clinch (at least) a quarterfinal berth, teams in strike go to Relegation Round)
Group A:
 8–3 
Germany's regulation loss sends them to the relegation round.  The Czech Republic receives a quarterfinal berth.
 4–2 
Canada advances to the semifinals, while Sweden advances to the quarterfinals.
Group B:
 0–7 
Finland advance to the semifinals, with a regulation win, and a regulation one-goal loss for USA against Russia, while Slovakia is sent to the relegation round.
 6–5 
Russia's one-goal regulation win combined with Finland's win over Slovakia send both teams to the quarterfinals.

Shooting
ISSF World Cup in Changwon, South Korea: (qualification scores in parentheses)
Men's 25 metre rapid fire pistol:  Aleksey Klimov  790.2 (590)  Keith Sanderson  787.3 (589)  Zhang Jian  785.7 (588)

Water polo
World League:
Preliminary round, Europe group C, matchday 4 of 6:
  12–15  (19:30)
 The win by Croatia eliminates Russia and Germany from qualifying. Croatia leads Spain by 4 points.

April 13, 2009 (Monday)

Baseball
Major League Baseball season home opener:
San Diego Padres 6, New York Mets 5
Citi Field, the Mets' new stadium, opens with a home run by the Padres' first batter Jody Gerut.

Basketball
NBA:
The Cleveland Cavaliers secure the best record in the League and home advantage throughout the playoffs with a 117–109 win over the Indiana Pacers.
The Detroit Pistons are confirmed as #8 seed and the Cavaliers' first round opponents after losing 91–88 to the Chicago Bulls.
The Denver Nuggets clinch the Northwest Division title and secure at least third place in the Western Conference with a 118–98 win over the Sacramento Kings. The Nuggets also tie their franchise record of 54 wins and will have home advantage in a playoff series for the first time in 21 years.
The Houston Rockets, Portland Trail Blazers and San Antonio Spurs are tied in third place, one game behind the Nuggets, with one game remaining. The Rockets have the tie-break edge over the Spurs for the Southwest Division title, and also hold the advantage over the Nuggets and the Trail Blazers.

Cricket
Australia in South Africa:
4th ODI in Port Elizabeth:
 317/6 (50 ov, Herschelle Gibbs 110);  256 (45.5 ov). South Africa win by 61 runs and take unassailable 3–1 lead in 5-match series.
ICC World Cup Qualifier in South Africa:
Super Eights: (Teams in italics gain ODI status)
In Benoni:  258/8 (50.0 ov);  262/8 (47.1 ov). Netherlands win by 2 wickets.
In Pretoria:  265/8 (50.0 ov);  268/4 (48.3 ov). Canada win by 6 wickets.
In Krugersdorp:  178 (49.4 ov);  154 (47.2 ov). Kenya win by 24 runs.
In Johannesburg:  133 (39.5 ov);  134/2 (27.4 ov). Ireland win by 8 wickets.
Standings after 5 of 7 rounds: Canada, Ireland 8 points, Kenya, Netherlands 6, Scotland, UAE 4, Afghanistan, Namibia 2.
9th Place Playoff:
In Potchefstroom:  352/7 (50 ov);  356/2 (48.3 ov). Bermuda win by 8 wickets.
11th Place Playoff:
In Potchefstroom:  220 (48.2 ov);  222/5 (41.4 ov). Oman win by 5 wickets.

Ice hockey
World U18 Championships in Fargo, North Dakota & Moorhead, Minnesota, United States: (Teams in bold secure a semifinal berth, teams in italics secure (at least) a quarterfinal berth, teams in strike go to Relegation Round)
Group A:
 11–0 
 3–4 (OT) 
Canada come back from 0–3 down and score the winning goal by Brett Connolly after 1:23 minute in overtime.
Standings: Sweden 9 pts (3 games), Canada 8 (3), Czech Rep. 4 (4), Germany 3 (3), Switzerland 0 (3)
Group B:
 10–1 
 12–0 
Standings: USA 9 pts (3 games), Finland, Russia 6 (3), Slovakia 3 (3), Norway 0 (4)

Motorcycle racing
Moto GP:
Qatar motorcycle Grand Prix in Doha, Qatar:
MotoGP: (1) Casey Stoner  (Ducati) 42:53.984 (2) Valentino Rossi  (Yamaha) + 7.771 (3) Jorge Lorenzo  (Yamaha) + 16.244

Shooting
ISSF World Cup in Changwon, South Korea: (qualification score in parentheses)
Women's 50 metre rifle three positions:  Yin Wen  685.2 (587)  Wan Xiangyan  676.8 (580)  Wang Chengyi  676.6 (582)
Women's 10 metre air pistol:  Tong Xin  489.4 (388)  Lee Ho-lim  488.3 (387)  Lalita Yauhleuskaya  487.8 (386)

April 12, 2009 (Sunday)

Auto racing
A1 Grand Prix:
Grand Prix of Nations, Portugal in Portimão, Portugal
Sprint race: (1)  Netherlands (Robert Doornbos) 19:33.501 (2)  Ireland (Adam Carroll) + 3.635 (3)  Portugal (Filipe Albuquerque) + 5.728
Feature race: (1)  Switzerland (Neel Jani) 1:10:45.011 (2) Portugal + 6.786 (3)  Malaysia (Fairuz Fauzy) + 9.705
Standings after 6 of 8 rounds (with dropped scores): (1) Ireland 86 points (2) Switzerland 84 (3) Portugal 82

Badminton
Asia Championships in Suwon, South Korea: (seeding in parentheses)
Men's singles: Bao Chunlai  (4) bt Chen Long  16–21, 21–10, 21–16
Women's singles: Zhu Lin  (6) bt Xie Xingfang  (5) 21–11, 21–10
Men's doubles: Markis Kido/Hendra Setiawan  (1) bt Ko Sung-Hyun/Yoo Yeon-Seong  (8) 21–18, 26–24
Women's doubles: Ma Jin/Wang Xiaoli  bt Lee Hyo-jung/Lee Kyung-Won  (3) 21–11, 21–18
Mixed doubles: Lee Yong-Dae/Lee Hyo-jung  (1) bt Yoo Yeon-Seong/Kim Min-Jung  21–12, 21–15

Basketball
NBA:
The Cleveland Cavaliers win 107–76 over the Boston Celtics, and need one more win in their two remaining games, or a Los Angeles Lakers loss in their only remaining game, to clinch the best record in the NBA and home court advantage throughout the playoffs. The Lakers keep their chances alive with a 92–75 win over the Memphis Grizzlies.
The San Antonio Spurs' 95–92 win over the Sacramento Kings puts them in a three-way-tie for third place in the Western Conference with the Houston Rockets and Portland Trail Blazers, and one game behind the Denver Nuggets in second place. All four teams have 2 games remaining.
The Miami Heat clinch fifth place in the Eastern Conference with a 122–105 win over the New York Knicks, and will play the Atlanta Hawks in the first round of the playoffs.

Cycling
Monument Classics:
Paris–Roubaix:
(1) Tom Boonen  6h 15'54" (2) Filippo Pozzato  (Team Katusha) + 47" (3) Thor Hushovd  (Cervélo TestTeam) + 1'17"
Boonen wins the "Hell of the North" for the third time, the sixth rider in the race history to do so.

Golf
Men's majors:
The Masters in Augusta, Georgia, fourth round:
Winner: Ángel Cabrera , on the second playoff hole.
Final standings: (1) Kenny Perry , Ángel Cabrera  & Chad Campbell  276 (−12)
Playoff:
First hole: (1) Cabrera & Perry 4 (E) (3) Campbell 5 (+1)
Second hole: (1) Cabrera 4 (E) (2) Perry 5 (+1)
Perry led by 2 strokes with 2 holes left to play, but bogeys in the last 2 holes make a 3-way playoff. Another bogey for Perry in the second extra hole give the title to Cabrera, who become the first Masters winner from South America.

Ice hockey
Kontinental Hockey League:
Gagarin Cup final best-of-7 series:
Game 7: Ak Bars Kazan 1–0 Lokomotiv Yaroslavl. Kazan win series 4–3.
Women's World Championships in Hameenlinna, Finland:
Gold medal game:   4–1  
Bronze medal game:   4–1 
World U18 Championships in Fargo, North Dakota & Moorhead, Minnesota, United States:
Group A:
 4–3 
Group B:
 1–8 
NHL:
The Pittsburgh Penguins clinch fourth place in the Eastern Conference and home advantage in the first round of the playoff, as a result of the Philadelphia Flyers' 4–3 loss to the New York Rangers.

Motorcycle racing
Moto GP:
Qatar motorcycle Grand Prix in Doha, Qatar:
MotoGP: Postponed to April 13 due to rain
250 cc: (1) Héctor Barberá  (2) Jules Cluzel  (3) Mike Di Meglio 
125 cc: (1) Andrea Iannone  (2) Julián Simón  (3) Sandro Cortese

Rugby union
Heineken Cup Quarter-finals:
Munster 43–9  Ospreys in Limerick
Harlequins  5–6 Leinster in London

Shooting
ISSF World Cup in Changwon, South Korea: (score in qualifying in parentheses)
Men's 50 metre rifle prone:  Warren Potent  700.0 (596) Josselin Henry  699.4 (596)  Ole Magnus Bakken  699.3 (597)
Men's 10 metre air pistol:  Leonid Yekimov  691.0 (587) Jin Jong-oh  689.7 (594 WR)  Shi Xinglong  685.9 (584)
In the qualification round, Jin set a world record with a score of 594, one point better than Sergei Pyzhianov's twenty-year-old mark.

Tennis
ATP Tour:
Grand Prix Hassan II in Casablanca, Morocco:
Final:  Juan Carlos Ferrero def.  Florent Serra 6–4, 7–5
Ferrero wins his first title in five years.
U.S. Men's Clay Court Championships in Houston, Texas, United States:
Final:  Lleyton Hewitt def.  Wayne Odesnik 6–2, 7–5
Hewitt wins his first title in two years.
WTA Tour:
MPS Group Championships in Ponte Vedra Beach, Florida, United States:
Final:  Caroline Wozniacki def.  Aleksandra Wozniak, 6–1, 6–2
Wozniacki wins her fourth title in 8 months.
Andalucia Tennis Experience in Marbella, Spain:
Final:  Jelena Janković def.  Carla Suárez Navarro, 6–3, 3–6, 6–3

Winter sports

Curling
World Men's Championship in Moncton, New Brunswick, Canada: (seeding in parentheses)
Final:  (2)  8–6  (1) 
A 2-stones steal in the 10th end gives Scotland its fifth title.
Bronze medal game: (3)  4–6  (4)

April 11, 2009 (Saturday)

Auto racing
Nationwide Series:
Pepsi 300 in Gladeville, Tennessee:
(1) Joey Logano  (Joe Gibbs Racing) (2) Kyle Busch  (Joe Gibbs Racing) (3) Brad Keselowski  (JR Motorsports)

Basketball
NBA:
The Boston Celtics clinch second place in the Eastern Conference and secure home advantage in the second round of the playoff as a result of the Orlando Magic's 103–93 loss to the New Jersey Nets.

Cricket
ICC World Cup Qualifier in South Africa:
Super Eights:
In Benoni:  181 (43.5 ov);  185/3 (34.3 ov). Canada win by 7 wickets.
In Pretoria:  280/7 (50 ov);  231/9 (50 ov). Namibia win by 49 runs.
In Krugersdorp:  218/7 (50 ov);  196 (47.3 ov). Afghanistan win by 22 runs.
In Johannesburg:  216/8 (50 ov);  190 (48.4 ov). Scotland win by 26 runs.
Standings after 4 of 7 rounds: Canada, Ireland 6 points, Kenya, Netherlands, Scotland, UAE 4, Afghanistan, Namibia 2.
9th–12th Place Playoffs:
In Potchefstroom:  292/6 (50 ov);  230/8 (50 ov). Uganda win by 62 runs.
In Potchefstroom:  254 (48.1 ov);  256/2 (48.2 ov). Bermuda win by 8 wickets.
Uganda and Bermuda will play for 9th place, while Denmark and Oman will play for 11th.

Cycling
UCI ProTour:
Vuelta al País Vasco:
Stage 6: (1) Alberto Contador  31min 59sec (2) Antonio Colom  at 0:22 (3) Samuel Sánchez  0:45
General classification – Final: (1) Contador 20hr 48min 30sec (2) Colom at 0:30 (3) Sanchez 0:53

Golf
Men's majors:
The Masters in Augusta, Georgia, third round:
Leaders: (1) Ángel Cabrera  & Kenny Perry  205 (−11) (3) Chad Campbell  207 (−9)

Ice hockey
World U18 Championships in Fargo, North Dakota & Moorhead, Minnesota, United States:
Group A:
 5–4 
 8–1 
Group B:
 7–2 
 4–3 
NHL:
The San Jose Sharks clinch the Presidents' Trophy for the League's best record as a result of the Boston Bruins' 6–1 loss to the Buffalo Sabres.
The Vancouver Canucks secure the Northwest Division title and the Western Conference third place with a 1–0 overtime win over the Colorado Avalanche.
NCAA Division I men's tournament:
Frozen Four in Washington, D.C.:
Championship game: Boston University 4, Miami (Ohio) 3 (OT)
The Terriers score 2 goals in the last minute of the 3rd period to level the score, and win the game with Colby Cohen's goal 11:47 minutes in overtime.

Rugby union
Heineken Cup Quarter-finals:
Cardiff Blues  9–6  Toulouse in Cardiff
Leicester Tigers  20–15  Bath in Leicester

Shooting
ISSF World Cup in Changwon, South Korea: (score in qualifying in parentheses)
Men's 50 metre pistol:  Jin Jong-oh  674.6 (575)  Leonid Yekimov  665.0 (573)  Mikhail Nestruyev  662.2 (567)
Women's 10 metre air rifle:  Yin Wen  500.6 (396)  Xie Jieqiong  500.5 (398)  Lee Da-hye  499.7 (398)
Women's 25 metre pistol:  Wu Yan  790.5 (586)  Yuliya Bondareva  788.9 (589)  Stefanie Thurmann  787.2 (582)

Winter sports

Curling
World Men's Championship in Moncton, New Brunswick, Canada: (seeding in parentheses)
Playoff:
(3)  5–4 (4)  (11 ends)
Switzerland advance to the semifinal, Norway go to bronze medal game.
Semifinal:
(3)  5–6 (1) 
Canada advance to the final, Switzerland go to bronze medal game.

April 10, 2009 (Friday)

Basketball
NBA:
The Detroit Pistons and the Chicago Bulls clinch the last two playoff berths in the Eastern Conference. The Pistons book their eighth straight playoff spot with a 100–93 win over the New Jersey Nets, while the Bulls advance as a result of the Charlotte Bobcats' 84–81 loss to the Oklahoma City Thunder.
The Cleveland Cavaliers secure first place in the Eastern Conference and home advantage for the first three rounds with a 102–92 win over the Philadelphia 76ers. The Cavaliers lead over the Los Angeles Lakers by 1½ games in the race for first place in the NBA and home advantage in the final series.
The Atlanta Hawks clinch fourth place in the Eastern Conference and home advantage in the first round with a 122–118 win over the Indiana Pacers.

Cycling
UCI ProTour:
Vuelta al País Vasco:
Stage 5: (1) Marco Pinotti  (Team Columbia–High Road) 4hr 15min 56sec (2) Ben Swift  (Team Katusha) + 19" (3) Francesco Gavazzi  s.t.
General classification: (1) Alberto Contador  20h16min 31sec (2) Samuel Sánchez  + 8" (3) Cadel Evans  s.t.

Golf
Men's majors:
The Masters in Augusta, Georgia, second round:
Leaders: (1) Chad Campbell  & Kenny Perry  135 (−9) (3) Ángel Cabrera  136 (−8)

Ice hockey
Kontinental Hockey League:
Gagarin Cup final best-of-7 series:
Game 6: Lokomotiv Yaroslavl 2–3 (OT) Ak Bars Kazan. Series tied 3–3.
Women's World Championships in Hameenlinna, Finland:
Group D:  1–2 
Both teams advance to the final.
Group E:  0–8 
Sweden advance to the bronze medal game against Finland.
Relegation round:  2–1 
Both teams are relegated to Division I in 2011.
World U18 Championships in Fargo, North Dakota & Moorhead, Minnesota, United States:
Group A:
 2–6 
Group B:
 5–2 
NHL:
The St. Louis Blues and the Anaheim Ducks clinch the last two playoff berths in the Western Conference. The Blues win 3–1 over the Columbus Blue Jackets and the Ducks win 4–3 in shootout over the Dallas Stars.

Shooting
ISSF World Cup in Changwon, South Korea: (score in qualifying in parentheses)
Men's 10 metre air rifle:  Zhu Qinan  700.3 (597)  Cao Yifei  698.6 (595)  Gagan Narang  696.7 (594)

Winter sports

Curling
World Men's Championship in Moncton, New Brunswick, Canada: (seeding in parentheses)
Tie-breakers: (winners advance to the playoff)
 10–2 
 7–8 
Playoff: (6.30 pm ET)
(1)  5–7 (2) 
Scotland advance to the final, Canada go to the semifinal.

April 9, 2009 (Thursday)

American football
National Football League:
Commissioner Roger Goodell suspends Buffalo Bills running back Marshawn Lynch for the first three games of the 2009 season for violating the league's personal conduct policy. Lynch was arrested on February 11 near Los Angeles after a police officer found a 9 mm semiautomatic handgun in the trunk of a parked car carrying him, and later pleaded guilty to a misdemeanor gun charge and sentenced to 80 hours of community service and three years' probation.

Baseball
Major League Baseball:
Nick Adenhart, a rookie starting pitcher for the Los Angeles Angels of Anaheim is killed along with three others in a car accident in Fullerton, California, just hours after starting a game for the Angels. The Angels' scheduled game with the Oakland Athletics is postponed. (ESPN)

Basketball
Euroleague Quarterfinals:
Game 5:
Regal FC Barcelona  78–62  TAU Cerámica. Barcelona win series 3–2.

Cricket
Australia in South Africa:
3rd ODI in Cape Town
 289/6 (50 ov);  264/7 (50 ov). South Africa win by 25 runs, lead 5-match series 2–1.

Cycling
UCI ProTour:
Vuelta al País Vasco:
Stage 4: (1) Michael Albasini  (Team Columbia–High Road) 3h 59' 42" (2) Jurgen Van den Broeck  s.t. (3) Christian Vande Velde  (Garmin–Slipstream) s.t.
General Classification: (1) Alberto Contador  16h 00' 16" (2) Samuel Sánchez  + 8" (3) Cadel Evans  Silence–Lotto s.t.

Football (soccer)
UEFA Cup Quarterfinals, first leg:
Shakhtar Donetsk  2–0  Marseille
Hamburg  3–1  Manchester City
Paris Saint-Germain  0–0  Dynamo Kyiv
Werder Bremen  3–1  Udinese
Copa Libertadores group stage: (teams in bold advance to the last-16 stage)
Group 1:
LDU Quito  1–1  Colo-Colo
Colo-Colo lead the group with 7 points from 4 games, followed by Sport Recife with 6 points from 3 games.
Group 2:
Boca Juniors  3–1  Guaraní
Boca Juniora win their fourth straight game, and lead the group with 12 points, while Guaraní lose their fourth game.
Group 4:
São Paulo  2–1  Defensor Sporting
São Paulo, who led the group on 10 points from 4 games, secure a berth in the last 16 stage.

Golf
Men's majors:
The Masters in Augusta, Georgia, first round:
Leaders: (1) Chad Campbell  65 (−7) (2) Jim Furyk  & Hunter Mahan  66 (−6)

Ice hockey
Women's World Championships in Hameenlinna, Finland:
Group D:  0–7 
USA and Canada advance to the final; Finland will play for bronze medal against Sweden or Russia.
Group E:  2–9 
Relegation Round:  3–2 
Switzerland's win allows them to stay in the Top Division; China and Japan are relegated to Division I for 2011.
World U18 Championships in Fargo, North Dakota & Moorhead, Minnesota, United States:
Group A:
 0–7 
 2–11 
Group B:
 7–4 
 0–8 
NCAA Division I men's tournament:
Frozen Four in Washington, D.C.:
National Semifinals:
Boston University 5, Vermont 4
Miami (Ohio) 4, Bemidji State 1
NHL:
The New York Rangers and the Montreal Canadiens clinch the last two playoff berths in the Eastern Conference. The Rangers win 2–1 over the Philadelphia Flyers, while the Canadiens lose 5–4 in overtime to the Boston Bruins.
The Washington Capitals clinch Eastern Conference second place with a 4–2 win over the Tampa Bay Lightning.
The New Jersey Devils clinch Atlantic Division title and Eastern Conference third place with a 3–2 shootout win over the Ottawa Senators.
The San Jose Sharks clinch Western Conference first place as a result of the Detroit Red Wings' loss to the Nashville Predators.

Winter sports

Curling
World Men's Championship in Moncton, New Brunswick, Canada: (Teams in bold advance to the playoff, teams in italics secure at least a tiebreaker, teams in strike are eliminated)
Draw 15:
 4–10 
 7–9 
 11–7 
Norway come back from 1–6 down after 4 ends to secure a tiebreaker.
 6–2 
Draw 16:
 8–3 
 10–3 
Scotland's win secure them at least a tiebreaker.
 7–6 
 9–3 
Draw 17: (in progress)
 6–9 
4-points steal in the 10th end gives USA a tiebreaker spot.
 3–5 
 4–5 
 5–6  (11 ends)
Scotland's win gives them a playoff berth, and a rematch against Canada on Friday.
Final standings after 17 draws: Canada 10–1, Scotland 8–3, Norway, USA, Germany, Switzerland 7–4, Denmark 5–6, France, China 4–7, Japan, Chech Rep. 3–8, Finland 1–10.

April 8, 2009 (Wednesday)

Basketball
NBA:
The Dallas Mavericks clinch the eighth and final playoff berth in the Western Conference with 130–101 win over the Utah Jazz.

Cricket
ICC World Cup Qualifier in South Africa: (teams in bold advance to the Super Eight)
Group A:
In Benoni:  252/7 (50 ov);  104 (30.5 ov). Canada win by 148 runs.
In Pretoria:  298/5 (50 ov);  302/9 (37.1 ov). Oman win by 1 wicket.
In Johannesburg:  213/9 (50 ov);  214/3 (45 ov). Ireland win by 7 wickets.
Oman's win over Uganda gives Namibia the last berth in the Super Eight by better net run rate.
Group B:
In Potchefstroom:  304/9 (50 ov);  241/9 (50 ov). Netherlands win by 63 runs.
In Vanderbijlpark:  251/8 (50 ov);  257/5 (47.2 ov). United Arab Emirates win by 5 wickets.
In Potchefstroom:  173/8 (50 ov);  174/1 (33.1 ov). Kenya win by 9 wickets.
Afghanistan clinch the fourth berth in the Super Eight despite their loss, as Bermuda lose as well.

Cycling
UCI ProTour:
Gent–Wevelgem:
(1) Edvald Boasson Hagen  (Team Columbia–High Road) 5hr 00min 15sec (2) Aleksandr Kuschynski  s.t. (3) Matthew Goss  (Team Saxo Bank) 0:53sec
Vuelta al País Vasco:
Stage 3: (1) Alberto Contador  4hr 16min 29sec (2) Cadel Evans  at 9sec (3) Samuel Sánchez  s.t.
General classification: (1) Contador 11hr 59min 08sec (2) Sanchez at 9sec (3) Evans s.t.

Football (soccer)
UEFA Champions League Quarterfinals, first leg:
Liverpool  1–3  Chelsea
Barcelona  4–0  Bayern Munich
Copa Libertadores group stage:
Group 1:
Sport Recife  0–2  Palmeiras
Group 5:
Estudiantes  4–0  Cruzeiro
Cruzeiro lead the group with 10 points from 5 games, followed by Estudiantes with 9 points.
Group 7:
Universidad de Chile  3–0  Boyacá Chicó
Group 8:
San Luis  2–0  San Lorenzo
San Luis' win keep their qualifying hopes alive and eliminates San Lorenzo. However, the Mexicans can advance only if they beat Libertad in Asunción and Universitario lose to San Lorenzo.
CONCACAF Champions League semifinals, second leg: (First leg result in parentheses)
Atlante  3–1 (1–2)  Santos Laguna
Atlante win 4–3 on aggregate.
AFC Champions League group stage, matchday 3:
Group B:
Sharjah  1–3  Al-Shabab
Persepolis  3–1  Al-Gharafa
Al-Shabab and Persepolis lead the group with 7 points.
Group D:
Bunyodkor  2–2  Sepahan
Al-Ettifaq  4–1  Al-Shabab Al-Arabi
Al-Ettifaq lead the group with 6 points.
Group F:
Gamba Osaka  5–0  Sriwijaya
Shandong Luneng  2–0  Seoul
Gamba Osaka score third straight win and lead the group with 9 points.
Group H:
Central Coast Mariners  0–5  Kawasaki Frontale
Pohang Steelers  1–0  Tianjin Teda
Kawasaki lead the group with 7 points.

Ice hockey
Kontinental Hockey League:
Gagarin Cup final best-of-7 series:
Game 5: Ak Bars Kazan 2–3 Lokomotiv Yaroslavl. Lokomotiv lead series 3–2.
Women's World Championships in Hameenlinna, Finland:
Group D:  8–0 
Group E:  9–0 
Relegation Round:  4–5 (SO) 
NHL:
The Columbus Blue Jackets clinch a playoff berth for the first time in franchise history with a 4–3 win after a shootout over the Chicago Blackhawks.

Winter sports

Curling
World Men's Championship in Moncton, New Brunswick, Canada: (Teams in bold advance to the playoff, teams in italics secure at least a tiebreaker, teams in strike are eliminated)
Draw 12:
 3–9 
 10–4 
 4–12 
 6–7  (11 ends)
Draw 13:
 6–8 
 9–6 
 1–9 
 4–7 
Draw 14:
 6–5  (11 ends)
 5–2 
 4–5 
 6–5 
Standings after 14 draws: Canada 9–0, Scotland, Norway 6–3, Denmark, USA, Germany, Switzerland 5–4, France 4–5, Japan, China 3–6, Czech Rep. 2–7, Finland 1–8.

April 7, 2009 (Tuesday)

Baseball
Major League Baseball season opening games:
American League:
Chicago White Sox 4, Kansas City Royals 2
Boston Red Sox 5, Tampa Bay Rays 3
Both games were postponed from Monday due to bad weather.
National League:
San Francisco Giants 10, Milwaukee Brewers 6

Basketball
NCAA women's Division I tournament:
Final Four in St. Louis, Missouri:
National Championship Game:
 (Trenton 1) Connecticut 76, (Raleigh 3) Louisville 54
The Huskies complete a perfect 39–0 season and win their sixth championship. UConn's Tina Charles is named Most Outstanding Player.
NBA:
The New Orleans Hornets clinch the seventh playoff berth in the Western Conference with a 93–87 overtime win over the Miami Heat.

Cricket
India in New Zealand:
3rd Test in Wellington, day 5:
 379 & 434/7d;  197 & 281/8 (Ross Taylor 107). Match abandoned due to rain and drawn. India win 3-Test series 1–0.

Cycling
UCI ProTour:
Vuelta al País Vasco:
Stage 2: (1) Yury Trofimov  (Bbox Bouygues Telecom) 4h 12' 46" (2) Rein Taaramäe  + 6" (3) Ben Swift  (Team Katusha) + 1' 10"
General Classification: (1) Luis León Sánchez  3h 28' 43" (2) Samuel Sánchez  s.t. (3) Jérôme Pineau  s.t.

Football (soccer)
UEFA Champions League Quarterfinals, first leg:
Villarreal  1–1  Arsenal
Manchester United  2–2  Porto
Copa Libertadores group stage: (Teams in bold advance to the last-16 stage)
Group 3:
Nacional  1–1  U. San Martín
River Plate  0–0  Nacional
Nacional (Uruguay) lead the group with 10 points from 4 games, and need one more point to qualify to the Last-16.
Group 7:
Grêmio  3–0  Aurora
Gremio lead the group with 10 points from 4 games.
Group 8:
Universitario  2–1  Libertad
Libertad, who already qualified, lead the group with 12 points from 5 games, ahead of Universitario on 8 points. A draw between San Lorenzo and San Luis on Wednesday will give the Peruvians a berth in the last 16.
CONCACAF Champions League semifinals, second leg: (First leg result in parentheses)
Cruz Azul  3–1 AET(0–2)  Puerto Rico Islanders
3–3 on aggregate. Cruz Azul win 4–2 in penalties.
AFC Champions League group stage, matchday 3:
Group A:
Saba Battery  0–2  Pakhtakor Tashkent
Al-Hilal  2–1  Al-Ahli
Pakhtakor lead the group with 7 points.
Group C:
Al-Jazira  0–0  Al-Ittihad
Umm-Salal  1–0  Esteghlal
Al-Ittihad lead the group with 7 points.
Group E:
Nagoya Grampus  1–1  Newcastle United Jets
Ulsan Hyundai Horang-i  1–0  Beijing Guoan
Nagoya lead the group with 5 points.
Group G:
Singapore Armed Forces  1–4  Kashima Antlers
Shanghai Shenhua  2–1  Suwon Bluewings
Suwon, Kashima and Shanghai are level at the top on 6 points.

Ice hockey
NHL:
The Philadelphia Flyers clinch a playoff berth with 2–1 win over the Florida Panthers.
The Pittsburgh Penguins clinch a playoff berth with 6–4 win over the Tampa Bay Lightning.

Winter sports

Curling
World Men's Championship in Moncton, New Brunswick, Canada:
Draw 9:
 8–3 
 9–7 
 1–9 
 5–7 
Draw 10:
 6–9 
 8–4 
 3–2 
 4–5 
Draw 11:
 2–8 
 3–9 
 8–4 
 2–9 
Standings after 11 draws: Canada 7–0, Norway 5–2, Denmark, Scotland, USA, Germany, France 4–3, Switzerland 3–4, Japan, China, Czech Republic 2–5, Finland 1–6.

April 6, 2009 (Monday)

Baseball
Major League Baseball season opening games:
National League:
New York Mets 2, Cincinnati Reds 1
Arizona Diamondbacks 9, Colorado Rockies 8
Florida Marlins 12, Washington Nationals 6
Pittsburgh Pirates 6, St. Louis Cardinals 4
Chicago Cubs 4, Houston Astros 2
Los Angeles Dodgers 4, San Diego Padres 1
American League:
Texas Rangers 9, Cleveland Indians 1
Baltimore Orioles 10, New York Yankees 5
CC Sabathia loses his first start for the Yankees.
Toronto Blue Jays 12, Detroit Tigers 5
Seattle Mariners 6, Minnesota Twins 1
This game kicked off the Twins' final season at the Metrodome.
Los Angeles Angels 3, Oakland Athletics 0
Kansas City Royals at Chicago White Sox, postponed due to snow
Tampa Bay Rays at Boston Red Sox, postponed due to rain

Basketball
NCAA men's Division I tournament:
Final Four in Detroit, Michigan:
National Championship Game:
 (South 1) North Carolina 89, (Midwest 2) Michigan State 72
The Tar Heels set championship game records with 55 points and a 21-point half time lead that the Spartans are not able to overcome. UNC's Wayne Ellington was named Most Outstanding Player.
Basketball Hall of Fame 2009 inductees are announced:
Players: Michael Jordan, David Robinson, John Stockton.
Coaches: Jerry Sloan, C. Vivian Stringer

Cricket
India in New Zealand:
3rd Test in Wellington, day 4:
  379 & 434/7d (116 ov.);  197 & 167/4 (56 ov.). New Zealand require another 450 runs with 6 wickets remaining.
ICC World Cup Qualifier in South Africa: (teams in bold advance to the Super Eight, teams in italics are eliminated)
Group A:
In Benoni:  220 (48 ov);  223/4 (41 ov). Ireland win by 6 wickets.
In Krugersdorp:  291/9 (50 ov);  172 (43.4 ov). Namibia win by 119 runs.
In Johannesburg:  209/8 (50 ov);  164 (43.1 ov). Scotland win by 45 runs.
Ireland remain the only unbeaten team with 8 points, followed by Canada and Scotland on 6 points. Namibia, Uganda and Oman fight for one remaining spot in the Super Eight.
Group B:
In Potchefstroom:  259/5 (50 ov);  260/3 (45 ov). Kenya win by 7 wickets.
In Vanderbijlpark:  204/9 (50 ov);  208/5 (46.2 ov). Netherlands win by 5 wickets.
In Potchefstroom:  379/6 (50 ov);  267 (44.4 ov). United Arab Emirates won by 112 runs.
Kenya, Netherlands and UAE are level at the top on 6 points. Afghanistan (4 pts) or Bermuda (2 pts) will clinch the last spot in the Super Eight.

Cycling
UCI ProTour:
Vuelta al País Vasco:
Stage 1: (1) Luis León Sánchez  (2) Samuel Sánchez  (3) Jérôme Pineau 

Ice hockey
Kontinental Hockey League:
Gagarin Cup final best-of-7 series:
Game 4: Lokomotiv Yaroslavl 2–5 Ak Bars Kazan. Series level 2–2.
Women's World Championships in Hameenlinna, Finland: (teams in bold advance to Group D, teams in italics advance to group E, teams in strike go to Relegation Round)
Pool A:  8–0 
Pool B:  7–0 
Pool C:  6–3

Winter sports

Curling
World Men's Championship in Moncton, New Brunswick, Canada:
Draw 6:
 9–8  (11 ends)
 5–7 
 7–2 
 9–6 
Draw 7:
 7–6 
 4–10 
 7–3 
 7–10 
Draw 8:
 5–7 
 6–5 
 6–4 
 8–9  (11 ends)
Standings after 8 draws: Canada, Norway 5–0, Scotland 4–1, USA, France 3–2, Switzerland, Denmark, Germany, Japan 2–3, Finland, Czech Rep. 1–4, China 0–5.

April 5, 2009 (Sunday)

Athletics

Paris Marathon:
Men: (1) Vincent Kipruto  2:05:47 (2) Bazu Worku  2:06:15 (3) David Kiyeng  2:06:26
Women: (2) Atsede Baysa  2:24:42 (2) Aselefech Mergia  2:25:02 (3) Christelle Daunay  2:25:43

Auto racing
Formula One:
Malaysian Grand Prix in Sepang, Malaysia:
(1) Jenson Button  (Brawn-Mercedes) (2) Nick Heidfeld  (BMW Sauber) +22.7 secs (3) Timo Glock  (Toyota) +23.5 secs
The race is called off after 31 laps, and therefore half of the points are awarded.
Drivers' standings after 2 races: (1) Button 15 points (2) Rubens Barrichello  10 (3) Jarno Trulli  8.5
Sprint Cup Series:
Samsung 500 in Fort Worth, Texas:
(1) Jeff Gordon  (Hendrick Motorsports) (2) Jimmie Johnson  (Hendrick Motorsports) (3) Greg Biffle  (Roush Fenway Racing)
Drivers' standings after 7 races: (1) Gordon 1154 points (2) Johnson −162 (3) Kurt Busch  −180
IndyCar Series:
Honda Grand Prix of St. Petersburg in St. Petersburg, Florida:
(1) Ryan Briscoe  (Penske Racing) 2:12:26.8387 (2) Ryan Hunter-Reay  (Vision Racing) +0.4619 (3) Justin Wilson  (Dale Coyne Racing) +0.9490
World Rally Championship:
Rally de Portugal:
(1) Sébastien Loeb  (Citroën C4) 3:53:13.1 (2) Mikko Hirvonen  (Ford Focus RS) 3:53:37.4 (3) Dani Sordo  Citroën C4 3:54:58.5
Drivers' standings after 4 of 12 races: (1) Loeb 40 points (2) Hirvonen 30 (3) Sordo 23

Baseball
  Major League Baseball season opening game:
Atlanta Braves 4, Philadelphia Phillies 1
 The Braves spoil the Phils' World Series celebration with three homers in the first two innings, plus eight shutout innings from starting pitcher Derek Lowe.

Basketball
NCAA women's Division I tournament:
Final Four in St. Louis, Missouri:
National Semifinals:
(Raleigh 3) Louisville 61, (Oklahoma City 1) Oklahoma 59
(Trenton 1) Connecticut 83, (Berkeley 2) Stanford 64
Eurocup Final Eight in Turin, Italy:
Final: Lietuvos Rytas  80–74  Khimki Moscow Region
Lietuvos Rytas win the Eurocup for the second time, and book a place in next season's EuroLeague.
Euroleague Women Final Four in Salamanca, Spain:
Final: Spartak Moscow  85–70  Salamanca
Spartak win the trophy for third straight year.
3rd place playoff: Ekaterinburg  80–56  Sopron
NBA:
The Portland Trail Blazers and Houston Rockets clinch playoff berths as a result of the Phoenix Suns' 140–116 loss to the Dallas Mavericks. For Portland it's the first playoff since 2003. Phoenix now trails Dallas by 4 games in the race for the last playoff spot in the Western Conference, with 5 games remaining.
The Utah Jazz also clinch a playoff berth, with a 108–94 win over the New Orleans Hornets. The Hornets need one win or a Suns loss to clinch a playoff berth.

Cricket
India in New Zealand:
3rd Test in Wellington, day 3:
 379 and 349/5 (Gautam Gambhir 167);  197. India lead by 531 runs with 5 wickets remaining.
Australia in South Africa:
2nd ODI in Centurion:
 131 (40.2 ov);  132/3 (26.2 ov). South Africa win by 7 wickets, 5-match series level 1–1.

Cycling
UCI ProTour:
Tour of Flanders:
(1) Stijn Devolder  6h 1' 4" (2) Heinrich Haussler  (Cervélo TestTeam) + 59" (3) Philippe Gilbert  s.t.

Football (soccer)
OFC Champions League Group stage, matchday 6:
Group A: Waitakere United  1–3  Auckland City FC
Auckland advance to the final.

Golf
PGA Tour:
Shell Houston Open in Humble, Texas:
Winner: Paul Casey  277 (−11)
Casey beat J. B. Holmes on the first playoff hole for his first PGA Tour title, and earns a trip to the Masters.
European Tour:
Estoril Open de Portugal in Cascais, Portugal:
Winner: Michael Hoey  277 (−7)
Hoey beat Gonzalo Fernández-Castaño on the third playoff hole for his first European Tour title.
LPGA Tour — Major championship:
Kraft Nabisco Championship in Rancho Mirage, California:
Winner: Brittany Lincicome  279 (−9)
An eagle on the final hole gives Lincicome her first major, edging out fellow Americans Kristy McPherson and Cristie Kerr by one stroke.

Gymnastics
European Artistic Gymnastics Championships in Milan, Italy:
Men:
Floor:  Fabian Hambuechen   Matthias Fahrig   Eleftherios Kosmidis   Alexander Shatilov 
Pommel horse:  Krisztián Berki   Louis Smith   Daniel Keatings 
Rings:  Yuri van Gelder   Olexandr Vorobiov   Yordan Yovchev 
Vault:  Thomas Bouhail   Flavius Koczi   Matthias Fahrig 
Parallel bars:  Yann Cucherat   Mitja Petkovšek   Fabian Hambuechen 
High bar:  Vlasios Maras   Yann Cucherat   Nikolay Kuksenkov 
Women:
Vault:  Ariella Kaeslin   Yulia Berger   Anna Kalashnyk 
Asymmetric bars:  Elizabeth Tweddle   Ksenia Semenova   Anja Brinker 
Beam:  Yana Demyanchuk   Anamaria Tămârjan   Gabriela Drăgoi 
Floor:  Elizabeth Tweddle   Vanessa Ferrari   Ksenia Semenova

Ice hockey
Women's World Championships in Hameenlinna, Finland: (teams in italics go to the Relegation Round)
Pool A:  3–1 
Pool B:  6–1 
Pool C:  1–2(SO) 
Kontinental Hockey League:
Gagarin Cup final, game 3:
Lokomotiv Yaroslavl 3–0 Ak Bars Kazan. Lokomotiv leads best-of-7 series 2–1.

Motorcycle racing
Superbike World Championship:
Valencia Superbike World Championship round in Valencia, Spain
Superbike:
Race 1: (1) Noriyuki Haga  (2) Michel Fabrizio  (3) Max Neukirchner 
Race 2: (1) Haga (2) Ben Spies  (3) Fabrizio
Riders' standings (after 3 of 14 events): (1) Haga 135 points (2) Spies 95 (3) Neukirchner 65

Rugby union
Sevens World Series:
Australia Sevens in Adelaide:
Final:  7–26 
World Series standings after 6 of 8 events: (1)  104 points (2)  76 (3)  74

Snooker
China Open in Beijing, China: (seeding in parentheses; best-of-19 frames)
Final: Peter Ebdon  (9) 10–8 John Higgins   (5)

Tennis
ATP Tour:
Sony Ericsson Open in Key Biscayne, Florida, United States
Final:  Andy Murray def.  Novak Djokovic, 6–2, 7–5.
Murray wins his 3rd title of the year and 3rd Masters 1000 of his career.

Winter sports

Curling
World Men's Championship in Moncton, New Brunswick, Canada:
Draw 3:
 6–12 
 10–9  (11 ends)
Draw 4:
 7–2 
 7–5 
 8–2 
 10–2 
Draw 5:
 3–10 
 8–2 
 4–9 
 11–8 
Standings after 5 draws: Canada, Norway 3–0, Scotland, USA, France 2–1, Czech Rep., Denmark, Finland, Germany, Japan, Switzerland 1–2, China 0–3.

April 4, 2009 (Saturday)

Auto racing
Nationwide Series:
O'Reilly 300 in Fort Worth, Texas:
(1) Kyle Busch  (Joe Gibbs Racing) (2) Tony Stewart  (Kevin Harvick Incorporated) (3) Brad Keselowski  (JR Motorsports)
American Le Mans Series:
Sports Car Challenge of St. Petersburg in St. Petersburg, Florida, United States
(1) David Brabham  & Scott Sharp  (2) Adrian Fernández  & Luis Díaz  (3) Chris Dyson  & Guy Smith

Basketball
NCAA men's Division I tournament:
Final Four in Detroit, Michigan:
National Semifinals:
(Midwest 2) Michigan State 82, (West 1) Connecticut 73
(South 1) North Carolina 83, (East 3) Villanova 69
Women's National Invitation Tournament:
Final in Lawrence, Kansas:
South Florida 75, Kansas 71
Eurocup Final Eight in Turin, Italy:
Semifinals:
Hemofarm  68–73  Lietuvos Rytas
Khimki Moscow Region  79–73  Iurbentia Bilbao
NBA:
The Philadelphia 76ers clinch a playoff berth with 95–90 win over the Detroit Pistons.

Cricket
India in New Zealand:
3rd Test in Wellington, day 2:
  379 (92.1 ov) & 51/1 (16 ov);  197 (65 ov) (Zaheer Khan 5/65, 18 ov). India lead by 233 runs with 9 wickets remaining in the second innings.
ICC World Cup Qualifier in South Africa:
Group A:
In Pretoria:  319 (50 ov);  178 (48 ov). Canada win by 141 runs.
In Krugersdorp:  155 (44.2 ov);  160/4 (31 ov). Ireland win by 6 wickets.
In Johannesburg:  274/9 (50 ov);  265/9 (50 ov). Scotland win by 9 runs.
Ireland and Canada win their third straight match and advance to the Super Eights. Namibia and Oman suffer their third loss.
Group B:
In Potchefstroom:  282/5 (50 ov);  175 (47 ov). Kenya win by 107 runs.
In Vanderbijlpark:  157 (48.3 ov);  160/1 (38.1 ov). Bermuda win by 9 wickets.
In Potchefstroom:  265 (49.3 ov);  268/8 (49.1 ov). United Arab Emirates win by 2 wickets.
Kenya, Netherlands, Afghanistan and UAE are level at the top on 4 points.

Gymnastics
European Artistic Gymnastics Championships in Milan, Italy:
Men's all-around:  Fabian Hambuechen  89.175  Daniel Keatings  88.275  Yury Ryazanov  88.200
Women's all-around:  Ksenia Semenova  58.175  Ksenia Afanasyeva  57.600  Ariella Kaeslin  57.275

Horse racing
Grand National in Aintree, England:
(1) Mon Mome, 100–1 (2) Comply or Die, 14–1 (3) My Will, 8–1

Ice hockey
Women's World Championships in Hameenlinna, Finland:
Pool A:  0–8 
Pool B:  1–13 
Pool C:  0–7 
NHL:
The Carolina Hurricanes clinch a playoff berth with 3–2 overtime win over the Pittsburgh Penguins.
The Boston Bruins clinch Eastern Conference first place with 1–0 win over the New York Rangers.

Tennis
WTA Tour:
Sony Ericsson Open in Key Biscayne, Florida, United States:
Final:  Victoria Azarenka def.  Serena Williams, 6–3, 6–1.
Azarenka wins her third title of the year.

Winter sports

Curling
World Men's Championship in Moncton, New Brunswick, Canada:
Draw 1:
 7–10  (11 ends)
 7–6 
 6–8  (11 ends)
 5–6 
Draw 2:
 1–9 
 4–7 
 7–5 
 9–4 
Standings after 2 draws: Norway 2–0, Canada, France, Switzerland, USA 1–0, Czech Rep., Finland 1–1, China, Germany, Japan, Scotland 0–1, Denmark 0–2.

Synchronized skating
World Championships in Zagreb, Croatia
 NEXXICE  223.58  Team Unique  220.28  Team Surprise  209.30

April 3, 2009 (Friday)

Baseball
  Nippon Professional Baseball Opening Day:
 Central League:
 Hiroshima Toyo Carp 6, Yomiuri Giants 3
 Chunichi Dragons 4, Yokohama BayStars 1
 Hanshin Tigers 5, Tokyo Yakult Swallows 2
 Pacific League:
 Tohoku Rakuten Golden Eagles 3, Hokkaido Nippon Ham Fighters 1
 Saitama Seibu Lions 5, Chiba Lotte Marines 2
 Fukuoka SoftBank Hawks 8, Orix Buffaloes 0

Basketball
Euroleague Women Final Four in Salamanca, Spain:
Semifinals:
Spartak Moscow  83–74  Ekaterinburg
Salamanca  85–78  Sopron
Eurocup Final Eight in Turin, Italy:
Quarterfinals:
Pamesa Valencia  73–76  Khimki Moscow Region
Iurbentia Bilbao  76–67  Zadar
College Basketball Invitational:
Championship best-of-3 series, game 3 in El Paso, Texas:
Oregon State 81, UTEP 73. Oregon State wins 2–1.
NBA:
The Miami Heat clinch a playoff berth with 97–92 win over the Charlotte Bobcats. The Heat become the second team in NBA history to reach the playoff after winning only 15 games the previous season.

Cricket
India in New Zealand:
3rd Test in Wellington, day 1:
 375/9 (90 ov).
England in West Indies:
5th ODI in Gros Islet, St Lucia:
 172/5 (29/29 ov);  146 (28.0/29 ov). England win by 26 runs and win 5-match series 3–2.
Australia in South Africa:
1st ODI in Durban:
 286/7 (50 ov.);  145 (33.1 ov). Australia win by 141 runs and lead 5-match series 1–0.

Ice hockey
NHL:
The Chicago Blackhawks clinch a playoff berth for the first time in seven years with 3–1 win over the Nashville Predators.
The Vancouver Canucks also clinch a playoff berth as a result of Nashville's loss to Chicago.
The Washington Capitals clinch the Southeast Division title with 4–5 overtime loss to the Buffalo Sabres.
Kontinental Hockey League:
Gagarin Cup final, game 2:
Ak Bars Kazan 4–3(OT) Lokomotiv Yaroslavl. Best-of-7 series tied 1–1.

Winter sports

Synchronized skating
World Championships in Zagreb, Croatia:
Short program: (1) Team Unique  82.36 points (2) NEXXICE  80.12 (3) Marigold IceUnity  78.68

April 2, 2009 (Thursday)

Auto racing
 Formula One news:
 Lewis Hamilton is disqualified from the Australian Grand Prix for giving misleading evidence to race stewards regarding Jarno Trulli's pass of him during a late safety car period. Trulli is restored to his original third-place position, and Hamilton's McLaren team is also stripped of its constructors' points. (AP/ESPN)

Basketball
Euroleague Quarterfinals:
Game 4 of best-of-5 series:
Real Madrid  75–78  Olympiacos Piraeus. Olympiacos wins series 3–1.
TAU Cerámica  63–84  Regal FC Barcelona. Series tied 2–2.
Montepaschi Siena  84–91  Panathinaikos Athens. Panathinaikos wins series 3–1.
Eurocup Final Eight in Turin, Italy:
Quarterfinals:
Dynamo Moscow  85–93  Hemofarm
Benetton Treviso  79–85  Lietuvos Rytas
National Invitation Tournament:
Final Four in New York:
Final: Penn State 69, Baylor 63

Cricket
ICC World Cup Qualifier in South Africa:
Group A:
In Pretoria:  267/6 (50 ov.);  194 (44.4 ov.). Scotland win by 73 runs.
In Krugersdorp:  285/4 (50 ov.);  169 (37.3 ov.). Ireland win by 116 runs.
In Johannesburg:  231/8 (50 ov.);  232/5 (47 ov.). Canada win by 5 wickets.
Group B:
In Potchefstroom:  245/8 (50 ov.);  246/3 (43 ov.). Netherlands win by 7 wickets.
In Vanderbijlpark:  79 (30.2 ov.);  80/1 (12.2 ov.). Kenya win by 9 wickets.
In Potchefstroom:  239/9 (50 ov.);  179 (49.3 ov). Afghanistan win by 60 runs.

Ice hockey
NHL:
The Calgary Flames clinch a playoff berth with 2–1 win over the Dallas Stars, and draw level with the Vancouver Canucks at the top of the Northwest Division.
Kontinental Hockey League:
Gagarin Cup final, game 1:
Ak Bars Kazan 0–3 Lokomotiv Yaroslavl. Lokomotiv lead best-of-7 series 1–0.

April 1, 2009 (Wednesday)

Basketball
College Basketball Invitational:
Championship best-of-3 series, game 2 in El Paso, Texas:
UTEP 70, Oregon State 63. Series tied 1–1.
Women's National Invitation Tournament:
 Semifinals:
 In Boston: South Florida 82, Boston College 65
 In Lawrence, Kansas: Kansas 75, Illinois State 72

Cricket
ICC World Cup Qualifier in South Africa:
Group A:
In Benoni:  232/7 (50 ov);  233/3 (37.4 ov). Ireland win by 7 wickets.
In Pretoria:  247 (49.3 ov);  144 (40 ov). Canada win by 103 runs.
In Krugersdorp:  234/7 (50 ov);  228/9 (50 ov). Uganda win by 6 runs.
Group B:
In Potchefstroom:  247/8 (50 ov);  248/3 (46.2 ov). Netherlands win by 7 wickets.
In Potchefstroom:  187 (46.3 ov);  190/6 (47.1 ov). United Arab Emirates win by 4 wickets.
In Vanderbijlpark:  204/9 (50 ov);  205/5 (46.2 ov). Afghanistan win by 5 wickets.

Football (soccer)
2010 FIFA World Cup Qualifying:
UEFA (Europe):
Group 1:
 3–0 
 3–0 
Denmark and Hungary lead the group on 13 points.
Group 2:
 2–0 
 2–1 
Israel's unbeaten streak in World Cup Qualifying ends after 19 matches and 8 years.
 2–0 
Greece and Switzerland lead the group on 13 points.
Group 3:
 1–2 
 10–0 
Poland score their biggest win in history.
 1–0 
Northern Ireland on top with 13 pts from 7 games, ahead of Slovakia on 12 points from 5 games.
Group 4:
 0–1 
 0–2 
Germany lead the group on 16 points, followed by Russia on 12 points.
Group 5:
 1–0 
 1–2 
Albert Riera's goal in injury time gives Spain its sixth straight win in this campaign and extends its unbeaten streak to 31 games.
 2–1 
Spain on top with 18 points, followed by Bosnia on 12 points.
Group 6:
 1–5 
 0–2 
 2–1 
John Terry's goal in the 85th minute maintains England's perfect record of 15 points from 5 matches, and keeps them 5 points clear of Croatia.
Group 7:
 2–1 
 1–0 
Franck Ribéry scores the winning goal for France, as he did in Kaunas on Saturday, and France goes to second place on 10 points, two behind Serbia.
Group 8:
 2–0 
 0–0 
 1–1 
Robbie Keane's goal in the 86th minute gives Ireland a draw in Bari. Italy lead the group on 14 points, two points ahead of Ireland.
Group 9:
 4–0 
 2–1 
The Dutch maintain their perfect record of 15 points in 5 games, and lead by 8 points over Scotland. A win over Iceland on June 6 will ensure the Oranje a trip to South Africa.
COMNEBOL (South America), matchday 12:
 6–1 
Unfancied Bolivia hand Argentina its worst defeat since a similar loss to Czechoslovakia in 1958, and drop the Argentines to fourth place.
 1–1 
Edgar Benítez scores in injury time to give Paraguay a draw, and keep them on top of the standings with 24 points, 3 points ahead of Brazil.
 0–0 
Chile stay in third place, while Uruguay remain in playoff-bound fifth place.
 3–0 
Brazil jump to second place, three points behind Paraguay.
Standings after 12 of 18 rounds: Paraguay 24 points, Brazil 21, Chile 20, Argentina 19, Uruguay 17, Colombia, Ecuador 14, Venezuela 13, Bolivia 12, Peru 7.
CONCACAF (North-Central America) Fourth Round, matchday 3:
 3–0 
Jozy Altidore becomes the youngest American man with an international hat-trick, and Team USA stays atop the hexagonal with 7 points from three games.
 3–1 
Carlos Costly scores two goals and lifts Los Catrachos to third place on 4 points, ahead of Mexico with 3 points.
 1–0 
Walter Centeno's goal in the 69th minute sends Los Ticos to second place in the group with 6 points, one point behind the USA.
AFC (Asia) Fourth Round, matchday 7:
Group A:
 2–0 
The Socceroos, with 13 points from 5 games, all but mathematically qualify to the final tournament.
 1–0 
Bahrain remain in contention for outright qualification, with 7 points from 6 games, 4 points behind Japan that has a game in hand. However, Japan can book its place in South Africa on the next matchday with win in Uzbekistan, that is level with Qatar on 4 points, and both teams can only hope for 3rd place that leads to playoff series.
Group B:
 1–0 
Kim Chi-Woo's goal in the 88th minute gives South Korea a win over their neighbour and put them on top of the group with 11 points from 5 games. North Korea has 10 pts from 6 games in second place. Wins for both Korean teams on the next matchday will secure them at least a playoff berth.
 3–2 
Saudi Arabia's win put them level with North Korea on 10 points and eliminate UAE.
Iran, that is idle, trails North Korea and Saudi Arabia by 4 points, with a game in hand.
Friendly internationals:
 1–1 
 3–2 
 2–0

References

4